= List of alumni of King's College London =

Alumni of King's College London comprise notable graduates as well as non-graduate former, and current, students. Those who studied at institutions later merged with King's College London may be considered alumni by extension. The list does not include those whose only connection with the college is (i) being a member of the staff, or (ii) the conferral of an honorary degree or honorary fellowship.

== Government and politics ==
=== Heads of state and government ===
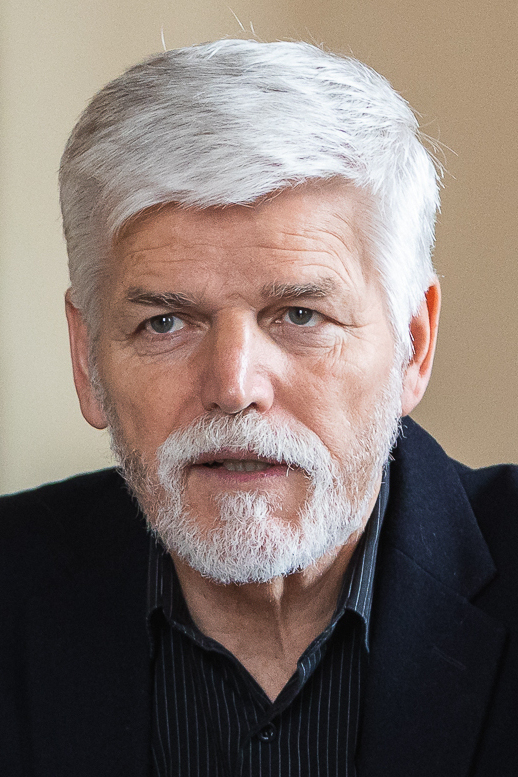
President of the Czech Republic Petr Pavel (MA)

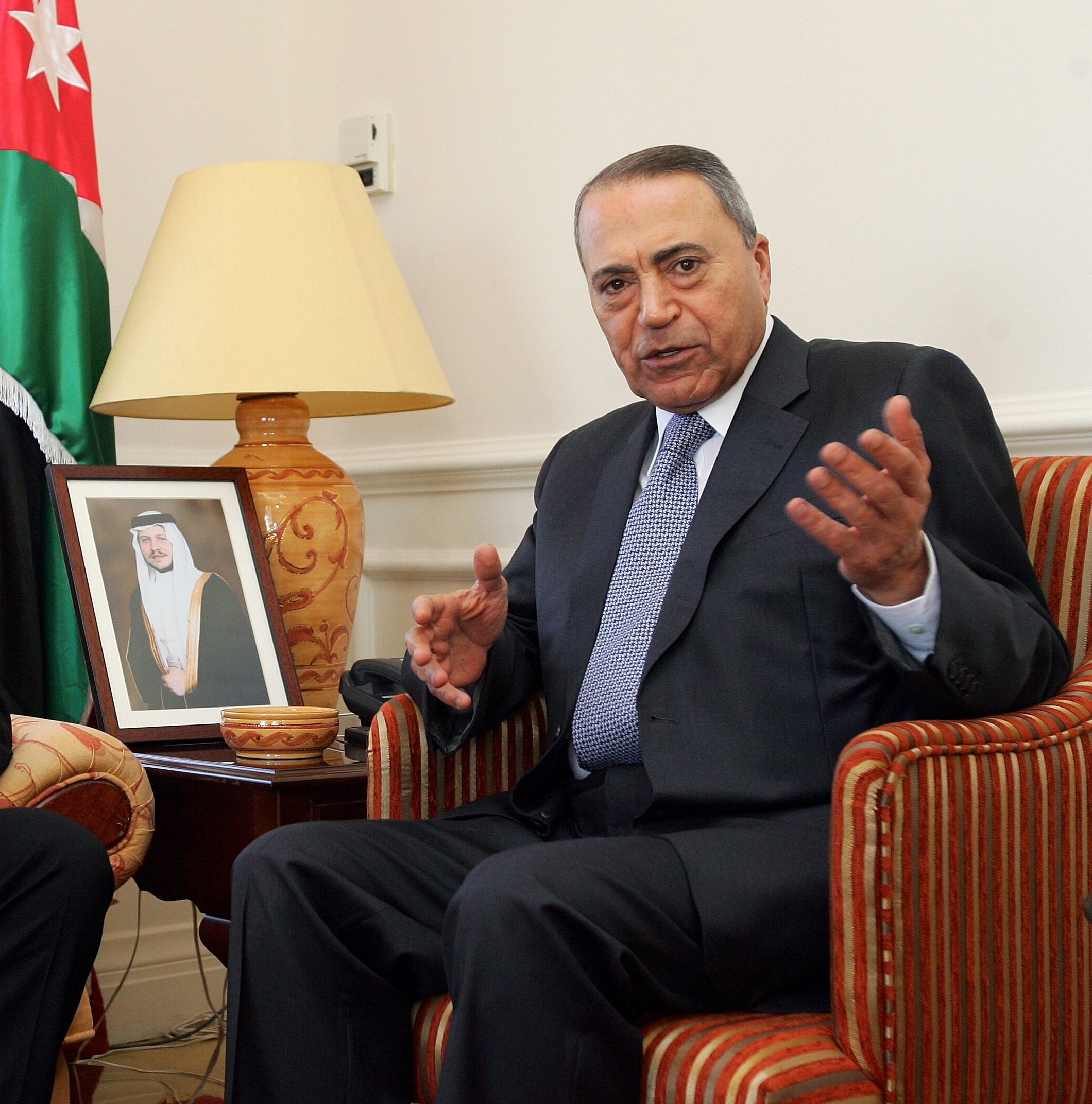
Prime Minister of Jordan Marouf al-Bakhit (PhD, 1990)

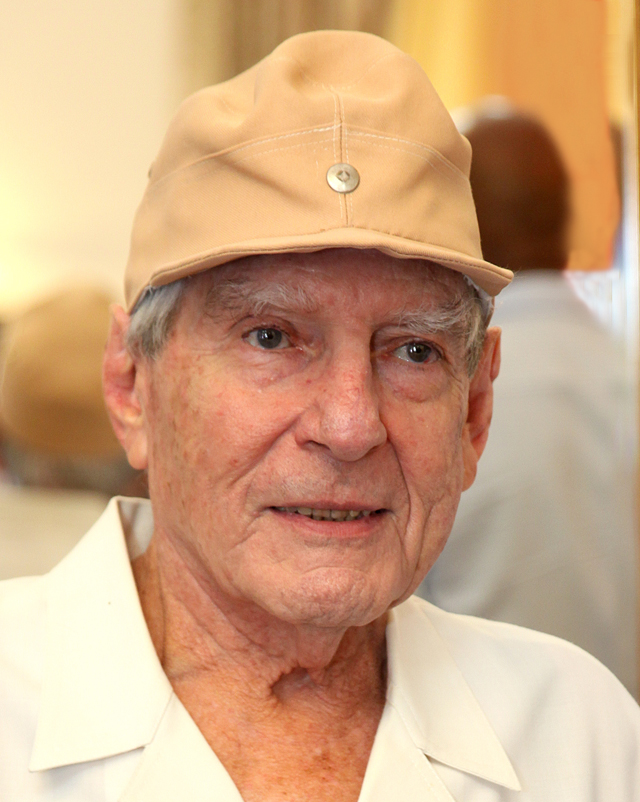
President and Prime Minister of Seychelles France-Albert René (LLB, 1957)

State / government	Individual	Office	Ref.
Bahamas	Sir Lynden Pindling	Prime Minister (1969–1992); Premier (1967–1969)	
British Indian Ocean Territory	Peter Hayes	Commissioner (2012–2016)	
British Indian Ocean Territory	John Kittmer	Commissioner (2016–2017)	
British Virgin Islands	Augustus Jaspert	Governor (2017–2021)	
Cyprus	Tassos Papadopoulos	President (2003–2008)	
Cyprus	Glafcos Clerides	President (1993–2003)	
Czech Republic	Petr Pavel	President (2023–)	
Falkland Islands	Nigel Phillips	Governor (2017–2022)	
Ghana	William Hare, 5th Earl of Listowel	Governor-General (1957–1960)	
Gibraltar	Ed Davis	Governor (2016–2020)	
Grenada	Maurice Bishop	President (1979–1983)	
Iraq	Abdul-Rahman al-Bazzaz	Prime Minister (1965–1966)	
Ireland	Michael Collins	Chairman of the Irish Provisional Government (1922)	
Jordan	Marouf al-Bakhit	Prime Minister (2005–2007; 2011)	
Mauritius	Eddy Balancy	Acting President (2019)	
Moldova	Natalia Gherman	Acting Prime Minister (2015)	
Saint Helena, Ascension and Tristan da Cunha	Nigel Phillips	Governor (2022–)	
Saint Kitts and Nevis	Sir Lee Moore	Prime Minister (1979–1980)	
Saint Vincent and the Grenadines	Sir Sydney Gun-Munro	Governor (1976–1979); Governor-General (1979–1985)	
Seychelles	France-Albert René	Prime Minister (1976–1977); President (1977–2004)	
Turks and Caicos Islands	Martin Bourke	Governor (1993–1996)	
Turks and Caicos Islands	John Freeman	Governor (2016–2019)	
Uganda	Godfrey Binaisa	President (1979–1981)	

=== United Kingdom ===
==== Current Members of the House of Commons ====
- Zubir Ahmed – Labour MP
- Calvin Bailey – Labour MP
- Lara Bird – Scottish National Party MP
- Alex Burghart – Conservative MP
- Al Carns - Labour MP
- Chris Coghlan – Liberal Democrat MP
- Sir Nic Dakin – Labour MP
- Mark Francois – Conservative MP
- John Glen – Conservative MP
- John Grady – Labour MP
- Dan Jarvis – Labour MP
- Mike Martin – Liberal Democrat MP
- Kevin McKenna – Labour MP
- Gagan Mohindra – Conservative MP
- Sarah Olney – Liberal Democrat MP
- Lucy Powell – Labour MP
- Sarah Russell – Labour MP
- Jeevun Sandher – Labour MP
- Tulip Siddiq – Labour MP
- Fred Thomas – Labour MP
- Gareth Thomas – Labour MP

==== Current Members of the House of Lords ====
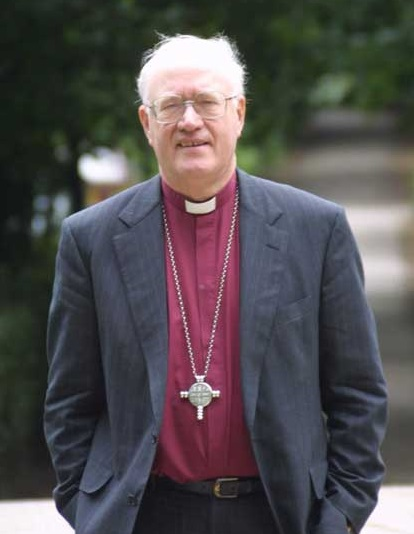
Former Archbishop of Canterbury George Carey (BD, 1962)

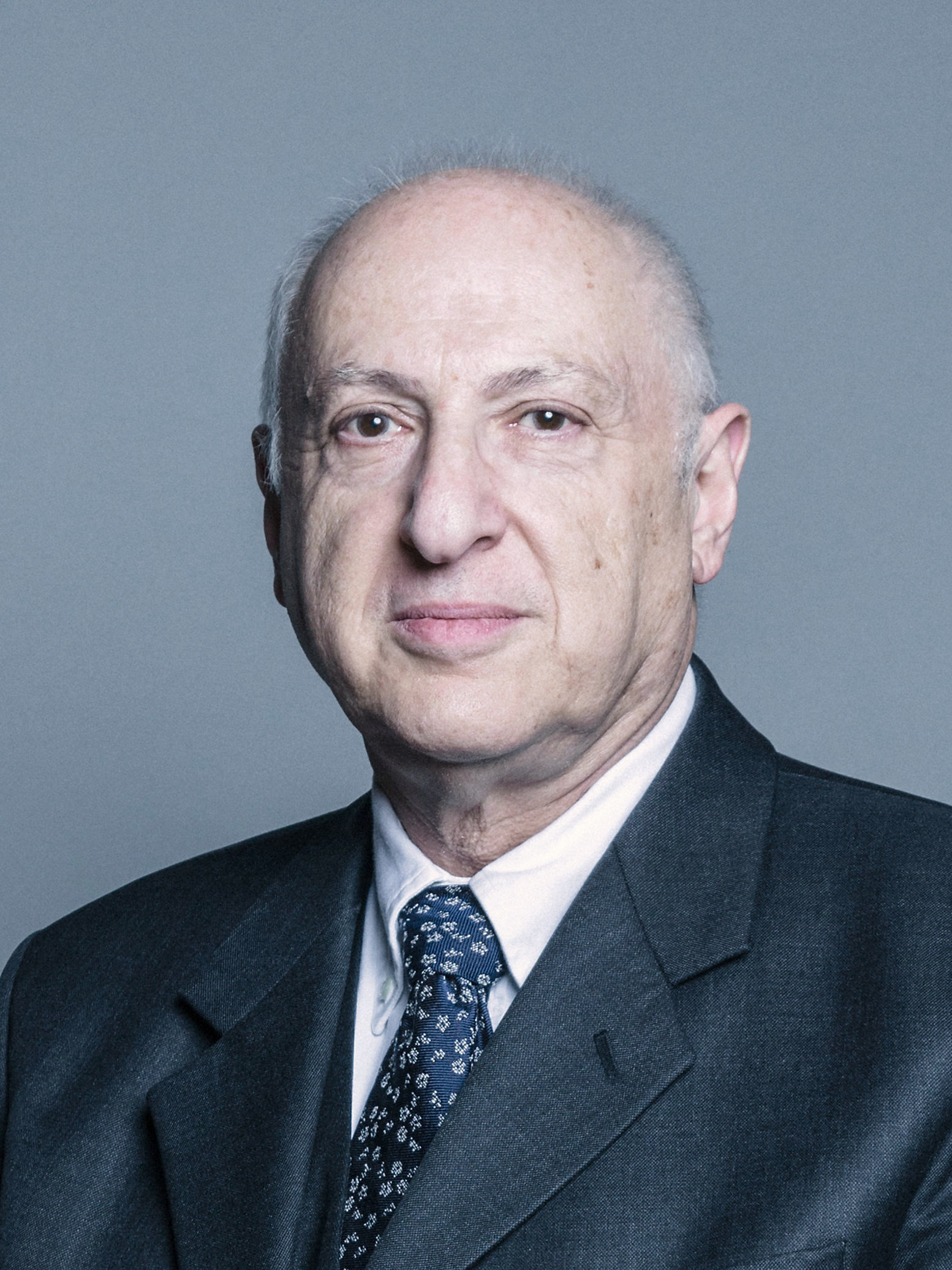
Crossbench peer Lord Carlile (LLB, 1969)

- Charles Banner, Baron Banner – Conservative peer
- George Carey, Baron Carey of Clifton – former Archbishop of Canterbury
- Alex Carlile, Baron Carlile of Berriew – Crossbench peer
- Andrew Dunlop, Baron Dunlop – Conservative peer
- Christopher Geidt, Baron Geidt – Crossbench peer
- Ajay Kakkar, Baron Kakkar – Crossbench peer
- Sally Morgan, Baroness Morgan of Huyton – Labour Peer
- Nuala O'Loan, Baroness O'Loan – Crossbench peer
- David Owen, Baron Owen – Crossbench peer and former Foreign Secretary
- Ted Rowlands, Baron Rowlands – Labour peer
- Kay Swinburne, Baroness Swinburne – Conservative peer
- Mary Watkins, Baroness Watkins of Tavistock – Crossbench peer

==== Other UK politicians ====
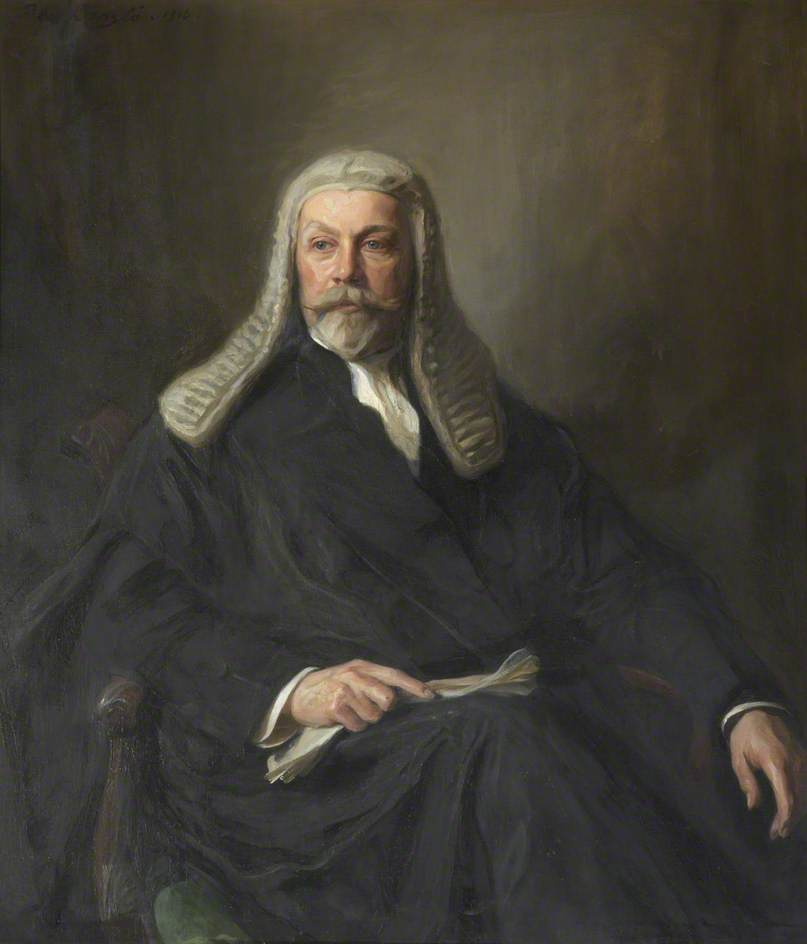
Speaker of the House of Commons James Lowther, 1st Viscount Ullswater (AKC)

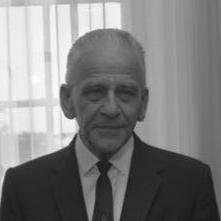
Speaker of the House of Commons Horace King, Baron Maybray-King (BA, 1922; PhD, 1940)

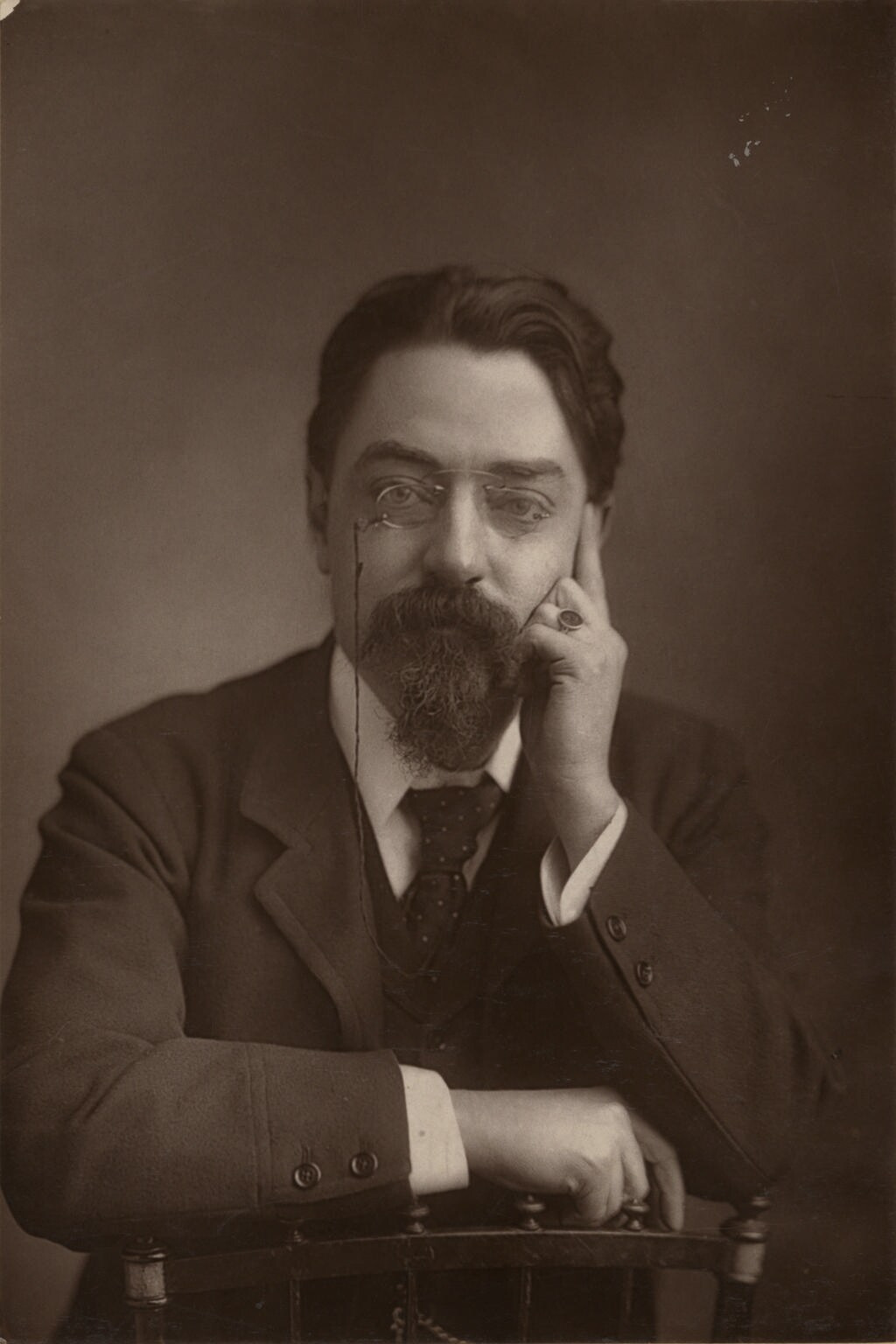
Sidney Webb, Labour peer and co-founder of the London School of Economics

- Imran Ahmad Khan – Conservative and then independent MP; suspended and resigned
- Steve Aiken – Member of the Northern Irish Assembly
- Sir Ronald Wilberforce Allen – Liberal MP
- Charles Bagnall – Conservative MP
- Jacob Bell – Liberal MP
- Sir John Bethell, 1st Baron Bethell – Liberal peer
- Sir Patrick Bishop – Conservative MP
- Terence Boston, Baron Boston of Faversham – Crossbench peer
- Thomas Bowles – Conservative and Liberal MP, founder of Vanity Fair magazine
- James Boyden – Labour MP
- Richard Braine – Leader of the UK Independence Party
- Alexander Brogden – Liberal MP
- Sir Edmund Byrne – Conservative MP
- Douglas Carswell – Conservative, UKIP and Independent MP
- Sir George Chetwynd – Labour MP
- Gavin Brown Clark – Liberal MP
- Michael Clark – Conservative MP
- Sir Edward Clarke – Conservative MP and Solicitor General for England and Wales
- Stanley Clinton-Davis, Baron Clinton-Davis – Labour peer and former EU Commissioner
- Tim Collins – Conservative MP
- Sir Henry Cotton – Liberal MP and President of the Indian National Congress
- James Dalziel, 1st Baron Dalziel of Kirkcaldy – Liberal peer
- John Dunwoody – Labour MP
- Natascha Engel – Labour MP
- William Finnie – Liberal MP
- Henry Gladstone, 1st Baron Gladstone of Hawarden – son and Private Secretary to William Gladstone
- Sir Richard Glass – Conservative MP
- Sir Augustus Godson – Conservative MP
- Joseph Green – National Democratic MP
- Robert Grosvenor, 2nd Baron Ebury – Liberal peer
- George Peabody Gooch – Liberal MP and historian
- Joseph Hardcastle – Liberal MP
- Charles Harrison – Liberal MP
- Sally-Ann Hart – Conservative MP
- Sir John Heaton, 1st Baronet – Conservative MP
- Charles Hopwood – Liberal MP
- Collingwood Hughes – Conservative MP
- Sir Clarendon Hyde – Liberal MP
- Frank James – Conservative MP
- Edward Johnson – Liberal MP
- Fay Jones – Conservative MP
- Horace King, Baron Maybray-King – Speaker of the House of Commons (1965–1970)
- Phillip Lee – Liberal Democrat MP
- Brandon Lewis – Conservative MP
- James Lowther, 1st Viscount Ullswater – Speaker of the House of Commons (1905–1921)
- John MacGregor, Baron MacGregor of Pulham Market – Conservative peer
- Fiona Mactaggart – Labour MP
- Sir John Maple, 1st Baronet – Conservative MP
- John Marek – Labour MP
- George Marks, 1st Baron Marks – Labour peer
- Tom Mason – Conservative Member of the Scottish Parliament
- Oonagh McDonald – Labour MP
- Allan Glaisyer Minns – First Black Mayor of a town/city in the UK
- Julie Morgan – Labour MP and Welsh Assembly Member
- Charles Newdegate – Conservative MP
- Sarah Newton – Conservative MP
- Matthew Offord – Conservative MP
- Evan Pateshall – Conservative MP
- Augustus Paulet, 15th Marquess of Winchester
- Sir Robert Perks, 1st Baronet – Liberal MP
- Colwyn Philipps, 3rd Viscount St Davids – Conservative peer
- Sir Philip Pilditch, 1st Baronet – Conservative MP
- Raymond Plant – Labour peer
- Dan Poulter – Labour MP
- William Priestley – Conservative MP
- John Puleston – Conservative MP
- Henry George Purchase – Liberal MP
- Pandeli Ralli – Liberal MP
- Sir William Rattigan – Liberal Unionist MP and Vice-Chancellor of Punjab University
- Thorold Rogers – Liberal MP and economist
- Sir John Rolleston – Conservative MP
- Sir Hugh Rossi – Conservative MP
- Dame Angela Rumbold – Conservative MP
- Sir Arthur Salter – Conservative MP and judge
- Bob Seely – Conservative MP
- Keith Simpson – Conservative MP
- Michael Stapleton-Cotton, 5th Viscount Combermere – Crossbench peer
- Howard Stoate – Labour MP
- Edward Strauss – Liberal MP
- Sir Gary Streeter – Conservative MP
- Edith Summerskill, Baroness Summerskill – Labour peer
- George Sutherland-Leveson-Gower, 3rd Duke of Sutherland – Liberal peer
- Jeffrey Thomas – Labour MP
- Michael Tomlinson – Conservative MP
- Sir Gerard Vaughan – Conservative MP
- Sir Kenneth Warren – Conservative MP
- Harold Watkinson, 1st Viscount Watkinson – Conservative peer and Cabinet Minister
- Sidney Webb, 1st Baron Passfield – Labour peer and Cabinet Minister; also the co-founder of London School of Economics (LSE)
- John Shiress Will – Liberal MP
- John Wilmot, 1st Baron Wilmot of Selmeston – Labour peer
- Sarah Wollaston – Conservative and Liberal MP
- Henry de Worms, 1st Baron Pirbright – Conservative peer
- David Warburton – Conservative MP
- Simon Wright – Liberal Democrat MP

=== Other politicians ===
==== Europe ====
- Recep Akdağ – Deputy Prime Minister of Turkey
- Georgios Anastassopoulos – Greek MEP
- Birgir Ármannsson – Speaker of the Icelandic Althing
- Paul Balban – Gibraltarian Member of Parliament
- Patrick Belton – Member of the Irish Dáil
- Konstantinos Bogdanos – Member of the Hellenic Parliament
- Tom de Bruijn – Dutch Foreign Minister
- Magnus Brunner – European commissioner
- Haresh Budhrani – Speaker of the Gibraltar Parliament
- Yehor Cherniev – Member of the Ukrainian Verkhovna Rada
- Gordan Georgiev – Member of the Assembly of the Republic of North Macedonia
- Alexandre Holroyd – Member of the French National Assembly
- Igli Hasani – Albanian Foreign Minister
- Kamal Jafarov – Member of the Azerbaijan Parliament
- Pål Jonson – Swedish Defence Minister
- Olga Kefalogianni – Greek Cabinet Minister
- Emil Kirjas – Macedonian politician
- Hannelore Kraft – Minister-President of North Rhine-Westphalia
- Gabriel Kroon – Member of the Swedish Riksdag
- Axelle Lemaire – French Minister for Digital Affairs
- Bernardino León – Head of the United Nations Support Mission in Libya
- Oliver Luksic – Member of the German Bundestag
- Bilal Macit – Member of the Grand National Assembly of Turkey
- Edgar Mann – Chairman of the Executive Council of the Isle of Man
- Nickolay Mladenov – UN Special Coordinator for the Middle East Peace Process and former Bulgarian Foreign Minister
- Giulia Moi – Italian MEP
- James Moorhouse – Conservative and Liberal Democrat MEP
- Krisztina Morvai – Hungarian MEP
- Eoghan Murphy – Member of the Irish Dáil
- Mihail Neamțu – Member of the Romanian Chamber of Deputies
- Pambos Papageorgiou – Member of the Cypriot House of Representatives
- Peter Price – Conservative MEP
- Jiří Šedivý – Czech Defence Minister
- Shaun Spiers – Labour MEP
- Eleni Stavrou – Member of the Cypriot House of Representatives
- Spyros Taliadouros – Member of the Hellenic Parliament
- Rebecca Taylor – Liberal Democrat MEP
- Jef Van Damme – Member of the Parliament of the Brussels-Capital Region

==== Americas ====
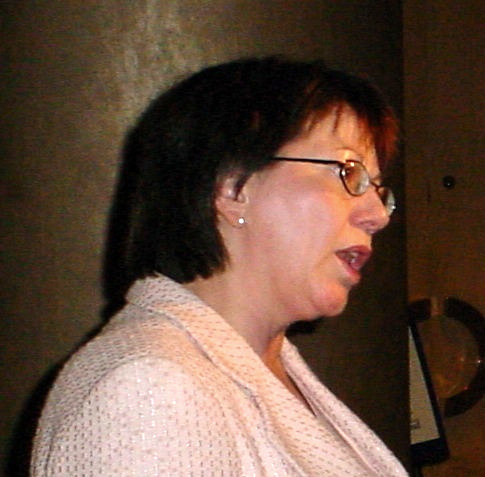
Deputy Prime Minister of Canada Anne McLellan (LLM, 1975)

- Francis Black – Canadian politician
- Hector Cameron – Member of the Canadian House of Commons
- Catherine Dorion – Member of the National Assembly of Quebec
- Andrew Exum – Middle East Scholar and Deputy Assistant Secretary of Defense for Middle East Policy
- Jerome Fitzgerald – Bahamian Education Minister
- Bob Frankford – Member of the Legislative Assembly of Ontario
- Colleen Graffy – US Deputy Assistant Secretary of State
- Richard Willis Jameson – Member of the Canadian House of Commons
- John Hillen – US Assistant Secretary of State for Political-Military Affairs
- Anne McLellan – Deputy Prime Minister of Canada
- Sir Shridath Ramphal – Commonwealth Secretary-General (1975–1990) and Guyanese Foreign Minister
- Christina Rocca – US Assistant Secretary of State for South and Central Asian Affairs
- David Arthur Singh – Guyanese Cabinet Minister
- Yaneth Giha Tovar – Colombian Education Minister
- Frederick Wills – Guyanese Foreign Minister

==== Asia ====
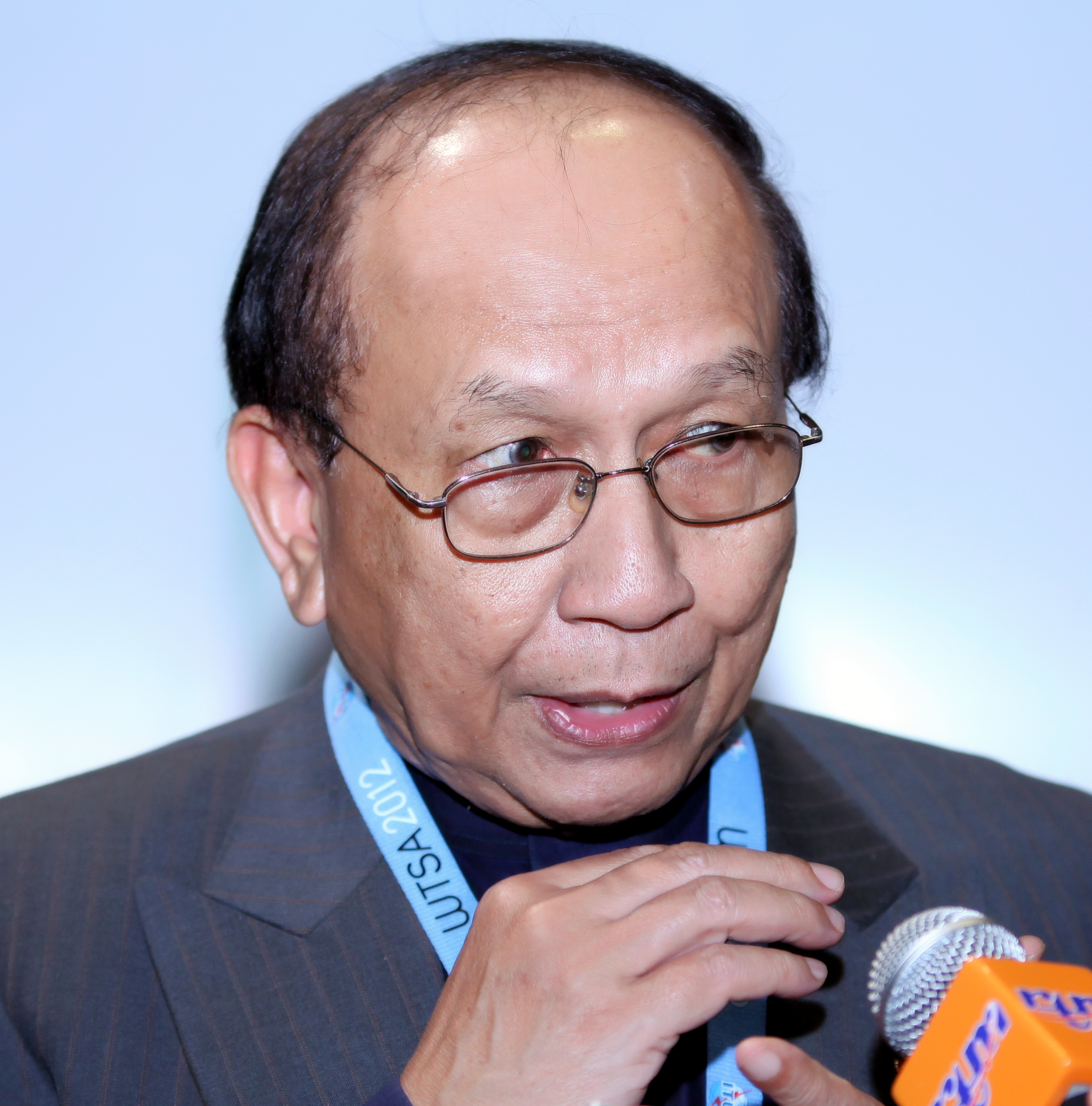
Malaysian Foreign Minister Rais Yatim (PhD, 1994)

- Shafique Ahmed – Bangladeshi Justice Minister
- Marriyum Aurangzeb – Senior Minister in Pakistan
- Maragatham Chandrasekar – Member of the Indian Lok Sabha
- Irene Chang – former Member of the Sarawak State Legislative Assembly
- Teresa Cheng – Secretary for Justice (Hong Kong)
- Azhar Azizan Harun – Speaker of the Dewan Rakyat
- Tan Chuan-Jin – former Speaker of the Parliament of Singapore
- Kakoli Ghosh Dastidar – Member of the Indian Lok Sabha
- Colvin R. de Silva – Sri Lankan Cabinet Minister
- Christopher de Souza – Deputy Speaker of the Parliament of Singapore
- Sushmita Dev – Member of the Indian Lok Sabha
- Faisal Saleh Hayat – Pakistani Interior Minister
- Anisul Huq – Bangladeshi Justice Minister
- Faizah Jamal – Member of the Singaporean Parliament
- Wan Ahmad Fayhsal Wan Ahmad Kamal – Malaysian Senator
- Sir Muhammad Zafarullah Khan – President of the UN General Assembly (1962), the International Court of Justice and Pakistani Foreign Minister
- Sikandar Hayat Khan – Prime Minister of Punjab
- Chitpas Kridakorn – Member of the Thai House of Representatives
- Dennis Kwok – Member of the Hong Kong Legislative Council
- Ahmad Massoud – National Resistance Front of Afghanistan leader
- Mohamed Ghassan Maumoon – Maldivian Defence Minister
- Sarojini Naidu – President of the Indian National Congress
- Nik Nazmi – Malaysian Cabinet Minister
- Sania Nishtar – Pakistani Education Minister
- S. C. C. Anthony Pillai – Member of the Indian Lok Sabha
- G. G. Ponnambalam – Sri Lankan Cabinet Minister
- S. Rajaratnam – former Deputy Prime Minister of Singapore
- Pritam Singh – Singaporean Opposition Leader
- Sirichok Sopha – Member of the Thai House of Representatives
- Hayashi Tadasu – Japanese Foreign Minister
- Desmond Tan – Minister of State in the Singaporean Prime Minister's Office, Member of the Singaporean Parliament, Deputy Secretary-General of the National Trades Union Congress
- Akara Tongjaisod – Member of the Thai House of Representatives
- Rais Yatim – Malaysian Foreign Minister, President of the Dewan Negara
- Alvin Yeo – former Member of the Singaporean Parliament

==== Middle East ====
- Alia Al-Dahlawi – Member of the Consultative Assembly of Saudi Arabia
- Mowaffak al-Rubaie – Member of the Iraqi Governing Council
- Fleur Hassan-Nahoum – Deputy Mayor of Jerusalem
- Ronen Hoffman – Member of the Israeli Knesset
- Ahmad Masa'deh – Jordanian politician
- Juwan Fouad Masum – Minister in the Iraqi Transitional Government
- Mohamed Qubaty – Yemeni Cabinet Minister
- Hayat Sindi – Member of the Consultative Assembly of Saudi Arabia

==== Africa ====
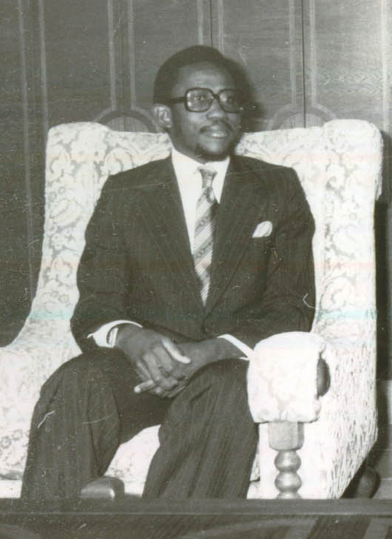
Vice President of Sierra Leone Abdulai Conteh (LLB, 1969)

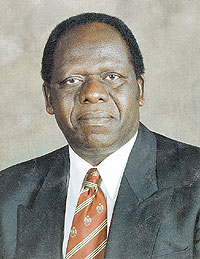
Vice President of Kenya Michael Kijana Wamalwa (LLB, 1968)

- Hassan al-Turabi – Sudanese Foreign Minister
- Obed Asamoah – Ghanaian Foreign Minister
- Ziad Bahaa-Eldin – Deputy Prime Minister of Egypt
- Abdulai Conteh – Vice President of Sierra Leone
- Joseph B. Dauda – Sierra Leonean Foreign Minister
- Ali Rasso Dido – Member of the Kenyan National Assembly
- Kayode Fayemi – Nigerian Cabinet Minister and, later, Regional Governor
- Alan Ganoo – Speaker of the National Assembly of Mauritius
- Roger Hawkins – Rhodesian Defence Minister
- Omobola Johnson – Nigerian Cabinet Minister
- Tamba Lamina – Sierra Leonean Cabinet Minister
- David Nana Larbie – Ghanaian Member of Parliament
- Francis Minah – Vice President of Sierra Leone
- Ned Nwoko – Member of the Nigerian House of Representatives
- Prince Chibudom Nwuche – Member of the Nigerian House of Representatives
- George Nyamweya – Member of the Kenyan National Assembly
- James Nyamweya – Kenyan Foreign Minister
- Sam Okudzeto – Ghanaian Member of Parliament
- Razack Peeroo – Speaker of the National Assembly of Mauritius
- Seham Sergiwa – Libyan politician
- Chukwuemeka Ujam – Member of the Nigerian House of Representatives
- Muhammad Uteem – Member of the Mauritian National Assembly
- Justin Valentin – Seychellois Education Minister
- Michael Kijana Wamalwa – Vice President of Kenya

==== Oceania ====
- Sir Stanley Argyle – Premier of Victoria
- Phillida Bunkle – Member of the New Zealand Parliament
- Sir Ernest Clark – Governor of Tasmania
- Sir John Cockburn – Premier of South Australia
- Charles Henry Grant – Australian Member of Parliament
- John Hargrave – Australian Member of Parliament and judge
- Horace Harper – Australian Member of Parliament
- Charles Beard Izard – Member of the New Zealand Parliament
- James Purves – Member of the Victorian Legislative Assembly
- Edward Wakefield – Member of the New Zealand Parliament
- James Walker – Senator for New South Wales

=== Diplomatic service ===
- Emmanuel Kodjoe Dadzie – Ghanaian diplomat
- Francis Deng – Permanent Representative of South Sudan to the United Nations
- Sir Francis Floud – British High Commissioner to Canada
- Judith Gough – British Ambassador to Sweden
- Victor Henderson – British Ambassador to Yemen
- Martin Kimani – Permanent Representative of Kenya to the United Nations
- Dianna Melrose – British Ambassador to Cuba and British High Commissioner to Tanzania
- Lawrence Middleton – British Ambassador to South Korea
- Colin Munro – British Ambassador to Croatia
- Archibald Rose – diplomat
- Pjer Šimunović – Croatian Ambassador to the United States
- Sir Edward Thornton – British Ambassador to the United States
- Shekou Touray – Permanent Representative of Sierra Leone to the United Nations
- John Tucknott – British Ambassador to Nepal
- Lois Young – Permanent Representative of Belize to the United Nations

== Royalty and nobility ==
- Prince Abdul Mateen of Brunei – member of the Bruneian royal family
- Princess Majeedah of Brunei – member of the Bruneian royal family
- Michael Evans-Freke, 12th Baron Carbery – Irish peer
- John Boyle, 14th Earl of Cork – Irish peer
- Rowland Allanson-Winn, 5th Baron Headley – Irish peer
- Louis-Napoléon, Prince Imperial – son of Emperor Napoleon III
- Rupert Onslow, 8th Earl of Onslow – British peer
- Prince Prisdang – diplomat and member of the Thai royal family
- Princess Antonia, Duchess of Wellington – great-granddaughter of Wilhelm II, German Emperor and the wife of the Duke of Wellington
- Alexander Windsor, Earl of Ulster – Son of Prince Richard, Duke of Gloucester

== Lawyers and judges ==
=== Judges ===
- Kwadwo Agyei Agyapong – Ghanaian High Court judge
- Geraldine Andrews – High Court judge
- Heather Williams – High Court judge
- Robin Auld – Lord Justice of Appeal
- Horace Avory – judge and criminal lawyer
- Kofi Adumua Bossman – Justice of the Supreme Court of Ghana
- Mackenzie Chalmers – Chief Justice of Gibraltar
- Harry Dias Bandaranaike – Chief Justice of the Supreme Court of Ceylon
- Louis Blom-Cooper – judge and lawyer
- Harold Bollers – Chief Justice of Guyana
- William Brett, 1st Viscount Esher – judge and lawyer
- Michael Caplan – judge and solicitor
- Bobbie Cheema-Grubb – High Court judge
- Fielding Clarke – Chief Justice of Fiji, Hong Kong and Jamaica
- Edmund Davies, Baron Edmund-Davies – Lord Justice of Appeal and Law Lord
- David Foskett – High Court judge
- Cyril Fountain – Chief Justice of The Bahamas
- David Foxton – High Court judge
- Chukwunweike Idigbe – Justice of the Supreme Court of Nigeria
- Neil Kaplan – judge and arbitrator
- Cecil Kelsick – Chief Justice of Trinidad and Tobago
- Frances Kirkham – judge
- Leonard Knowles – Chief Justice of The Bahamas
- Abdul Koroma – Judge of the International Court of Justice
- Nthomeng Majara – Chief Justice of Lesotho
- Rajashekhar Mantha – Judge of Calcutta High Court
- Wayne Martin – former Chief Justice of Western Australia
- Walter Morgan – Chief Justice of Madras High Court
- David Penry-Davey – High Court judge
- Syed Shah Mohammed Quadri – Judge, Supreme Court of India (1997–2003)
- Sophon Ratanakorn – President of the Supreme Court of Thailand
- Patrick Lipton Robinson – Judge of the International Court of Justice
- Ilana Rovner – judge
- Jenny Rowe – Chief Executive of the Supreme Court of the United Kingdom
- J. Sarkodee-Addo – Chief Justice of Ghana
- Jaishanker Manilal Shelat – Justice, Supreme Court of India (1966–73)
- Jeremy Sullivan – Senior President of Tribunals
- John Taylor – Chief Justice of Lagos
- Nicholas Thompsell – High Court judge
- Thomas Webb – judge
- Christopher Weeramantry – Vice-president of the International Court of Justice
- James Wicks – Chief Justice of Kenya

=== Attorneys General ===
- Michael Ashikodi Agbamuche – Nigerian Attorney General
- Faris Al-Rawi – Trinidadian Attorney General
- Lois Browne-Evans – Bermudan Attorney General
- Francis Chang-Sam – Seychellois Attorney General
- Shehzad Ata Elahi – Pakistani Attorney General
- Marlene Malahoo Forte – Jamaican Attorney General
- Nabo Bekinbo Graham-Douglas – Nigerian Attorney General
- K. C. Kamalasabayson – Sri Lankan Attorney General
- Trevor Moniz – Bermudan Attorney General
- Priscilla Schwartz – Sierra Leonean Attorney General
- Michael Whitley – Singaporean Attorney General

=== Other lawyers ===
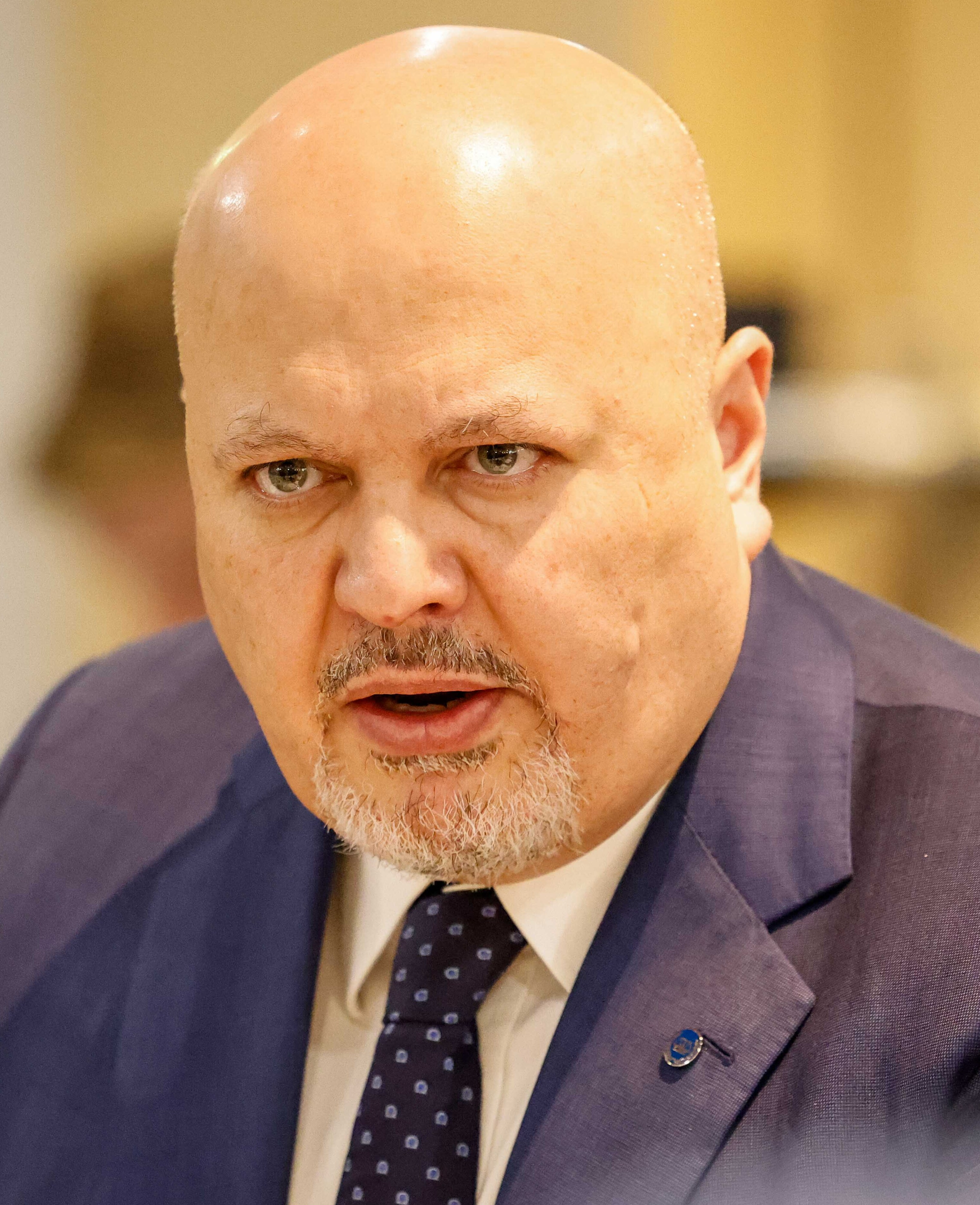
Chief Prosecutor of the International Criminal Court Karim Ahmad Khan (LLB)

- Rafiuddin Ahmed – barrister
- Brian Altman – Lead Counsel for the Independent Inquiry into Child Sexual Abuse
- William Amiet – barrister
- I. Stephanie Boyce – President of the Law Society of England and Wales
- Richard Stephen Charnock – solicitor, topographer, and antiquary
- Philippe Couvreur – registrar at the International Court of Justice
- Cormac Cullinan – lawyer
- John Eekelaar – legal scholar
- Michael Fox – lawyer
- Joshua Geltzer – former Deputy White House Counsel
- Kevon Glickman – entertainment lawyer
- Karim Ahmad Khan – Chief Prosecutor of the International Criminal Court
- Aeneas James George Mackay – lawyer
- Amber Marks – barrister
- Peter McCormick – lawyer
- Mary O'Rourke – barrister
- William Soulsby – barrister
- Eulalie Spicer – lawyer and legal aid administrator, one of the most prominent divorce lawyers of her day
- Tunji Sowande – first Black head of a major UK barristers' chambers set
- Joanna Toch – barrister
- John Uff – international arbitrator
- Thiruvendran Vignarajah – Maryland attorney

== Police and security specialists ==
- Colin Cramphorn – Chief Constable of West Yorkshire Police
- Richard A. Falkenrath – Deputy Commissioner of Counter-Terrorism of the New York City Police Department
- Michael A. Levi – Senior Fellow at the Council on Foreign Relations
- Maroof Raza – international security expert
- Ayesha Siddiqa – military scientist
- Tsai Ming-yen – Director-General of the National Security Bureau (Taiwan)
- Paddy Tomkins – police Chief Inspector
- John Yates – Metropolitan Police head of counter-terrorism

== Armed forces ==
=== Head of armed forces or an armed forces' service branch ===
- Harsha Abeywickrama – former Commander of the Sri Lankan Air Force
- Sohail Aman – Pakistani Chief of Air Staff
- Peter Harling Boysen – Chief of the Royal Danish Army
- Sir Simon Bryant – Commander-in-Chief of RAF Air Command
- Jayanath Colombage – Commander of the Sri Lankan Navy
- Renato Rodrigues de Aguiar Freire – Head of the Brazilian Armed Forces
- Sir Stephen Hillier – Chief of the Air Staff
- Mel Hupfeld – Chief of Air Force of Royal Australian Air Force
- Md Hashim bin Hussein – Chief of Army (Malaysia)
- Mohammad Sharif Ibrahim – Commander of the Royal Brunei Air Force
- Ola Ibrahim – Chief of the Defence Staff (Nigeria)
- Pratap Chandra Lal – Commander & Chief of Air Staff
- Sir Chris Moran – Commander-in-Chief of RAF Air Command
- Neo Kian Hong – Chief of Defence Force (Singapore)
- Peter Mbogo Njiru – Commander, Kenya Army
- Sir Richard Peirse – Commander-in-Chief of the Indian Air Force and of RAF Bomber Command
- Sir Tony Radakin – Chief of the Defence Staff
- Hamzah Sahat – Commander of the Royal Brunei Armed Forces
- Simon Stuart – Chief of Army (Australia)
- Nishantha Ulugetenne – Commander of the Sri Lankan Navy
- Sir Michael Wigston – Chief of the Air Staff
- Martin Xuereb – Head of the Armed Forces of Malta
- Waker-uz-Zaman – Chief of Army Staff (Bangladesh)

=== Other military officers ===
- Edward Ahlgren – Commander Operations
- Farid Ahmadi – Afghan army officer
- A. T. M. Zahirul Alam – Force Commander of the United Nations Mission in Liberia
- Tim Anderson – Director-General of the Military Aviation Authority
- Simon Asquith – Royal Navy Commander Operations
- Sir Stuart Atha – Air Officer Commanding No 1 Group
- Hugh Beard – Controller of the Navy
- Mark Sever Bell – recipient of the Victoria Cross
- Sir Keith Blount – Deputy Supreme Allied Commander Europe
- Sir Adrian Bradshaw – Deputy Supreme Allied Commander Europe
- Bob Braham – World War II flying ace
- Andrew Burns – Commander United Kingdom Maritime Forces
- Hans Busk – army reformer
- Rich Cantrill – Commander Operations
- James Chiswell – General Officer Commanding the 1st Armoured Division
- John Clink – Flag Officer Scotland, Northern England, Northern Ireland
- Ben Connable – retired US Marine major, Professor at the Frederick S. Pardee RAND Graduate School
- Michael Conway – Director General of the Army Legal Services Branch
- Paul Crespo – US Marine captain
- Peter Drissell – Commandant-General of the RAF Regiment
- Sir Herbert Edwardes – army and political officer
- Michael Elviss – British Army officer
- Stanley Smyth Flower – army officer
- Sir Robert Fry – Commandant General Royal Marines
- Sir Wira Gardiner – soldier and public servant
- Sir Richard Garwood – Deputy Commander-in-Chief Operations at RAF Air Command
- Elizabeth Godwin – first female officer of The Life Guards
- Sir Frederic Goldsmid – Major-General, British Army
- Dame Helen Gwynne-Vaughan – Commandant of the Women's Royal Air Force and Chief Controller of the Auxiliary Territorial Service
- Sir Chris Harper – UK Military Representative to NATO and the EU
- Michael Harwood – RAF Air Vice-Marshal
- Syed Ata Hasnain – Indian Army General
- Sir Nick Hine – Assistant Chief of the Naval Staff (Policy)
- Matthew Holmes – Commandant General Royal Marines
- Richard Henry Jelf – Governor and Commandant of the Royal Military Academy, Woolwich
- Russell La Forte – Commander of the British Forces South Atlantic Islands
- Mohammad Humayun Kabir – Force Commander of United Nations Peacekeeping Force in Cyprus
- Ferdinand Le Quesne – recipient of the Victoria Cross
- Suraya Marshall – Air Officer Commanding of No. 2 Group RAF
- Dame Vera Laughton Mathews – Director of the Women's Royal Naval Service
- Sir Simon Mayall – Middle East Adviser at the Ministry of Defence
- James Morse – Controller of the Navy
- Sir Barry North – Assistant Chief of the Air Staff
- Richard Nugee – Defence Services Secretary
- James Parkin – Controller of the Navy
- Robert Pedre – Commander United Kingdom Strike Force
- Sir Tim Radford – Deputy Supreme Allied Commander Europe
- Javed Iqbal Ramday – President of the National Defence University, Pakistan
- Pat Reid – army officer and author
- Andy Salmon – Commandant General Royal Marines
- Stuart Skeates – Commandant of the Royal Military Academy Sandhurst
- Sir Arthur Sloggett – Director General Army Medical Services
- Michael Smeath – RAF officer
- Sir Graham Stacey – Deputy Commander, Allied Joint Force Command Brunssum
- Paul Tedman – Commander United Kingdom Space Command
- Jude Terry – Naval Secretary
- Robert Thomson – Commander of British Forces Cyprus
- Rupert Thorneloe – Welsh Guards officer killed in action in Afghanistan
- Garry Tunnicliffe – Defence Services Secretary
- Tyrone Urch – General Officer Commanding Force Troops Command
- David Walker – RAF Air Marshal
- William Warrender – Flag Officer Sea Training

== Academics ==
=== Heads of institutions ===
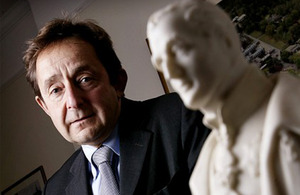
Sir Anthony Seldon (PGCE, 1983)

- Robert Allison – Vice-Chancellor of Loughborough University
- Harold Balme – President of Cheeloo University
- Kenneth Barker – Vice-Chancellor of De Montfort University and Thames Valley University
- Sir James Barrett – Vice-Chancellor of the University of Melbourne
- Kenneth Dike – Vice-Chancellor of the University of Ibadan
- Malcolm Gillies – Vice-Chancellor of City University, London and London Metropolitan University
- Carl Gombrich – co-founder and academic lead of the London Interdisciplinary School
- Devendra Prasad Gupta – Vice-Chancellor of Ranchi University
- Sir Andrew Haines – Director of the London School of Hygiene & Tropical Medicine
- Kenneth Hare – Master of Birkbeck College and President of the University of British Columbia
- Kenneth Hill – Vice-Chancellor of the University of Benin, Nigeria
- Kristín Ingólfsdóttir – Rector of the University of Iceland
- Qasim Jan – Vice-Chancellor of the University of Peshawar, Sarhad University of Science and Information Technology and Quaid-i-Azam University
- George Kitchin – Vice-Chancellor of the University of Durham
- Sedat Laçiner – Rector of Çanakkale Onsekiz Mart University
- Sir Alec Merrison – Vice-Chancellor of the University of Bristol
- David Petley – Vice-Chancellor of the University of Hull
- Nicola Phillips – Vice-Chancellor of Adelaide University (2026–)
- Barney Pityana – Vice-Chancellor of the University of South Africa
- Sir Joseph Pope – Vice-Chancellor of Aston University
- Bernadette Porter – Vice-Chancellor of the University of Roehampton
- Dame Alison Richard – Vice-Chancellor of the University of Cambridge
- Dame Janet Ritterman – Director of the Royal College of Music and Chancellor of Middlesex University
- Sir Frederick Robertson – Vice-Chancellor of the Punjab University
- Dame Nancy Rothwell – President of the University of Manchester
- Sir Anthony Seldon – Vice-Chancellor of the University of Buckingham and Tony Blair's biographer
- John Spinks – President of the University of Saskatchewan
- Francis Stock – Vice-Chancellor of the University of Natal
- Robert Street – Vice-Chancellor of the University of Western Australia
- Sir Richard Sykes – Rector of Imperial College London and Chairman of GlaxoSmithKline
- Chris Taylor – Vice-Chancellor of the University of Bradford
- Henry Wace – Principal of King's College London
- Rob Warner – Vice-Chancellor of Plymouth Marjon University
- Paul Wellings – Vice-Chancellor of the University of Lancaster and the University of Wollongong
- Lee Pey Woan – Dean of the Yong Pung How School of Law, Singapore Management University
- Steven West – Vice-Chancellor of the University of the West of England
- Anne Wright – Vice-Chancellor of the University of Sunderland

=== Historians ===
- John Romilly Allen – archaeologist
- Ali M. Ansari – Professor of Modern History with reference to the Middle East at the University of St Andrews
- Sir Raymond Beazley – historian
- Matthew Bennett – historian
- Brian Bond – military historian
- Alfred John Church – classical scholar
- Sir William Laird Clowes – naval historian
- Sebastian Cox – RAF historian
- Paul Davis – military historian
- Richard MacGillivray Dawkins – archaeologist
- Katherine Elizabeth Fleming – historian
- Ian Gooderson – military historian
- Andrew Gordon – naval historian
- Judith Green – medieval historian
- Mark Grimsley – historian
- Eric Grove – naval historian
- Richard Grunberger – historian
- D. G. E. Hall – historian
- Christopher Harper-Bill – historian
- Dorothy King – archaeologist
- Robert Knecht – historian
- Amélie Kuhrt – historian
- Andrew Lambert – naval historian
- Marc Morris – historian
- Percy Newberry – Egyptologist
- Peter Paret – historian
- Fern Riddell – cultural historian
- Lyndal Roper – Regius Professor of History (Oxford)
- Philip Sabin – military historian
- Gary Sheffield – military historian
- Anne Somerset – historian
- Geoffrey Till – naval historian
- Colin White – Director of the Royal Naval Museum
- Donald Wiseman – archaeologist

=== Theologians ===
- E. W. Bullinger – dispensationalist theologian
- Andrew Linzey – founder and director of the Oxford Centre for Animal Ethics
- Julius J. Lipner – Hindu scholar
- Eric J. Lott – religious scholar
- Ralph Martin – New Testament scholar
- Peter Medd – priest and scholar
- Cris Rogers – theologian
- Henry Barclay Swete – biblical scholar
- Sidney Thelwall – Christian scholar
- Anthony Thiselton – theologian
- Evelyn Underhill – theologian
- Peter Vardy – theologian and philosopher
- Ralph Waller – theologian
- Robin Ward – Principal of St Stephen's House, Oxford

=== Others ===
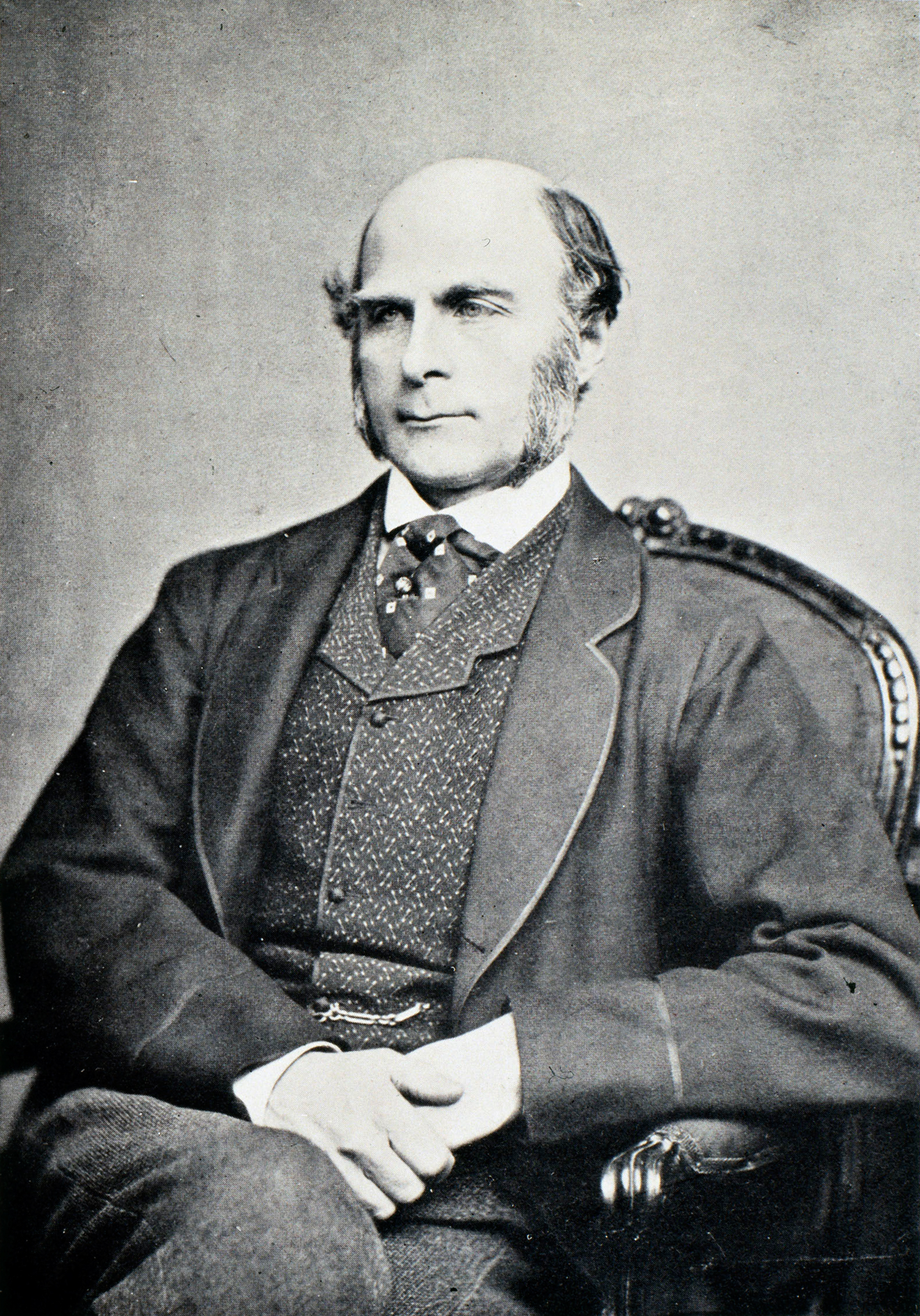
Polymath Sir Francis Galton (Medicine, 1839)

- Helen Beebee – philosopher
- Robert Lubbock Bensly – orientalist
- Jo Boaler – mathematics professor at Stanford University
- Nick Bostrom – philosopher
- Ahron Bregman – political scientist
- Harry Brighouse – political philosopher
- Matthew Bryden – political analyst
- Arthur Coke Burnell – translator
- Elizabeth Burns – philosopher
- Robert Caldwell – Master of Corpus Christi College, Cambridge
- Raymond Cattell – psychologist
- Alexander Coker – UN chemical weapons inspector
- Josh Cooper – cryptographer
- Karen Cox – Deputy Vice Chancellor University of Nottingham
- Brian Davies – philosopher
- Sir Ian Gainsford – Vice-Principal of King's College London
- Sir Francis Galton – polymath
- Clara Knight – classicist
- Francisco Javier Carrillo Gamboa – economist
- Rosemary Hollis – political scientist
- Sir John Maddox – editor of Nature
- Joseph Shield Nicholson – economist
- Karl Pearson – Deputy Professor of Mathematics
- Wendy Piatt – Director General of The Russell Group
- Eleanor Plumer – Principal of St Anne's College, Oxford
- Stathis Psillos – philosopher of science
- John Thomas Quekett – microscopist and histologist
- Fiona Ross – nursing scholar
- Lucinda Roy – literary scholar
- Frederick Rushmore – Master of St Catharine's College, Cambridge
- Paul Salkovskis – psychologist
- Georgios Samaras – lecturer in Political Economy at King's College London
- Dan Sarooshi – legal scholar
- Yezid Sayigh – Middle East scholar
- Winston Wole Soboyejo – mechanical and aerospace engineer
- Muthucumaraswamy Sornarajah – legal scholar
- Edgar Thurston – Lecturer at Madras Medical College
- John Tooze – scientific administrator
- Nicla Vassallo – philosopher
- Sir Ralph Wedgwood, 4th Baronet – philosopher
- Edward William West – orientalist

== Scientists ==
=== Biologists ===
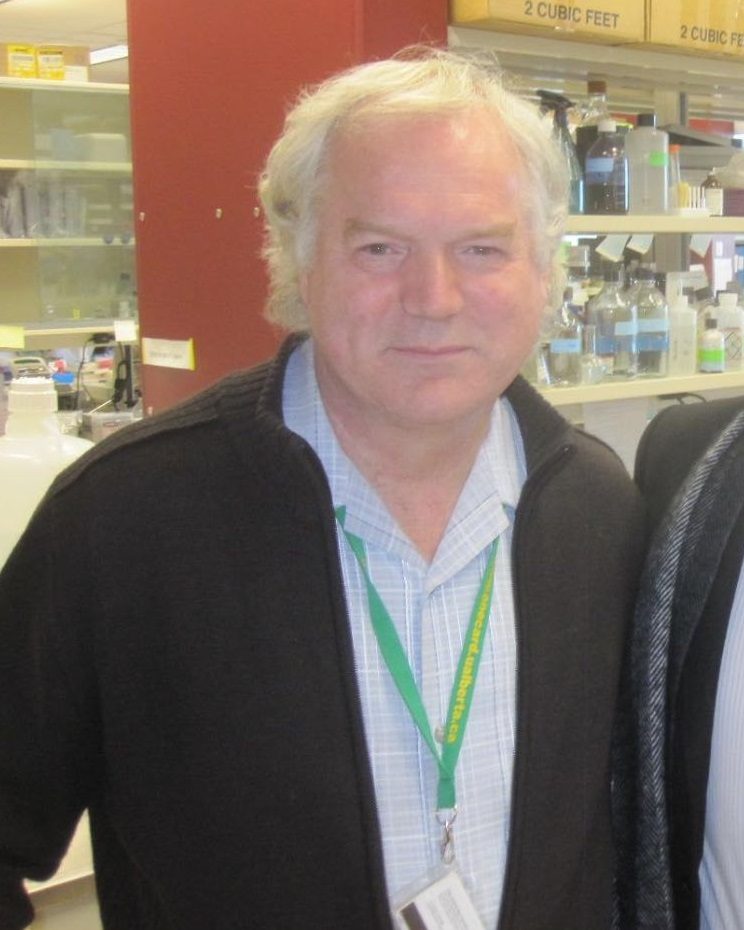
Winner of the 2020 Nobel Prize in Physiology or Medicine Sir Michael Houghton (Ph.D. 1977) co-discoverer of Hepatitis C in 1989

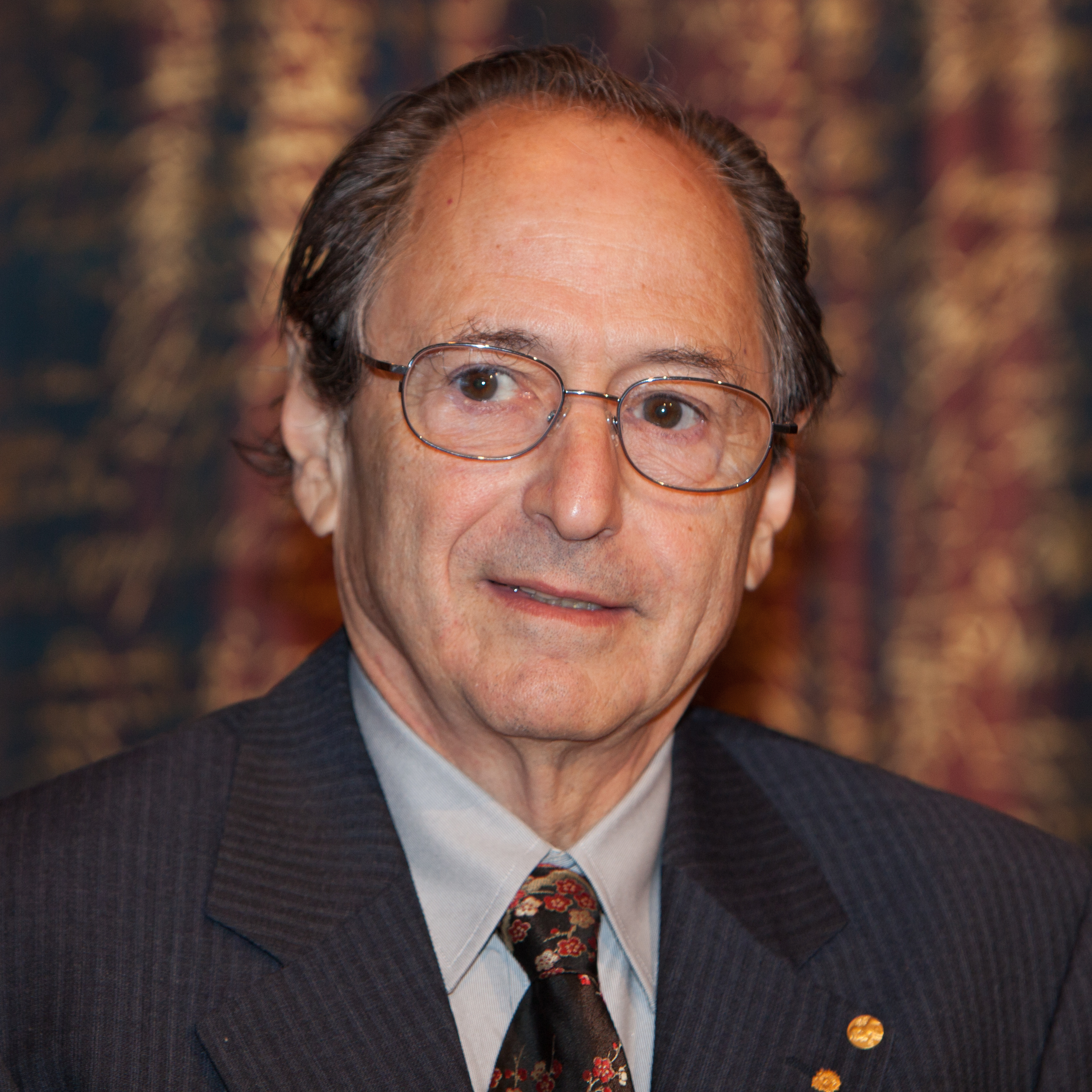
Winner of the 2013 Nobel Prize in Chemistry Michael Levitt (BSc, 1967)

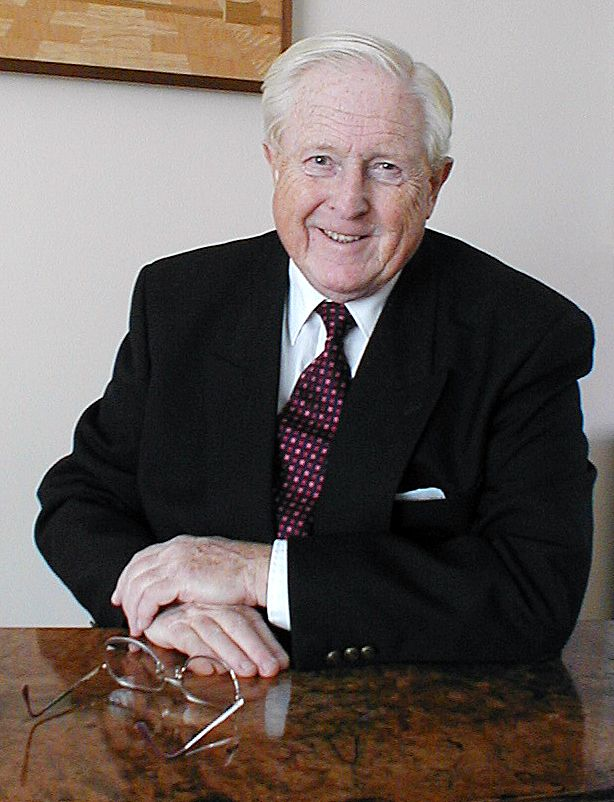
Raymond Gosling (PhD, 1954) took Photograph 51 which was critical evidence in identifying the structure of DNA

- Denis Alexander – molecular biologist and theologian
- Eric Barnard – neuroscientist
- Angus John Bateman – geneticist
- Lionel Smith Beale – physician
- Thomas Cavalier-Smith – Professor of Evolutionary Biology at the University of Oxford
- Qui-Lim Choo – co-discoverer of Hepatitis C and of the Hepatitis D genome
- Keith Campbell – led team that cloned Dolly the sheep
- Sir Howard Dalton – microbiologist
- Paula Cohen – geneticist
- Michael Denton – biochemist and author
- Sir Jack Drummond – biochemist
- R. John Ellis – Gairdner Foundation International Award-winning biochemist
- Charles Edmund Ford – cytogeneticist
- Mary English – mycologist
- Christine Foyer – biologist
- Nicholas Franks – biophysicist
- Raymond Gosling – DNA researcher
- Keith Gull – microbiologist
- Hugh Gurling – geneticist
- Jean Hanson – biophysicist and zoologist
- Denis Haydon – membrane biophysicist
- Edward Hindle – biologist
- Christine Holt – neuroscientist
- Rob Horne – physician
- Mark Abie Horowitz – neuroscientist
- Sir Michael Houghton – 2020 Nobel Prize in Physiology or Medicine laureate and co-discoverer of Hepatitis C and of the Hepatitis D genome
- John Hughes – Lasker Award-winning neuroscientist
- Charles Leonard Huskins – geneticist
- Alwyn Jones – biophysicist
- Andrew King – neurophysiologist
- Michael Levitt – 2013 Nobel Prize in Chemistry laureate and Professor of Structural Biology at Stanford University
- Joel Mandelstam – microbiologist
- St. George Jackson Mivart – biologist
- Noreen Murray – molecular geneticist who helped develop a vaccine against Hepatitis B
- John Newton – epidemiologist
- Anthony Pawson – Kyoto Prize laureate
- Sir Rudolph Peters – biochemist
- Rohan Pethiyagoda – taxonomist
- Sir Andrew Pollard – Chief Investigator on the Oxford–AstraZeneca COVID-19 vaccine
- Peter Rabin-biochemist University of Toronto
- Sheila Rodwell – nutritional epidemiologist
- Steven Rose – biologist and neurobiologist
- Helen Saibil – biologist
- William Saville-Kent – marine biologist
- Nigel Scrutton – biochemist
- Robert Malcolm Simmons – Director of the Randall Division of Cell and Molecular Biophysics
- Stephen Simpson – biologist
- Audrey Smith – cryobiologist
- Bruce Stocker – microbiologist
- David Stuart – structural biologist
- Sylvia Agnes Sophia Tait – biochemist and endocrinologist
- Dame Janet Thornton – Director of the European Bioinformatics Institute
- Sir Graham Wilson – bacteriologist
- Lewis Wolpert – developmental biologist

=== Botanists ===
- David Bellamy – botanist
- Robert Bentley – botanist
- David Catcheside – plant geneticist
- Sydney Harland – botanist
- Eric John Hewitt – plant physiologist
- Maxwell Masters – botanist
- Daphne Osborne – botanist

=== Computer scientists ===
- Steve Bourne – computer scientist
- Ian H. S. Cullimore – computer scientist
- Darren Dalcher – computer scientist
- Luciano da Fontoura Costa- professor, Multidisciplinary Computing Group, Institute of Physics, São Carlos, University of São Paulo
- Hassan Ugail – computer scientist
- J. W. J. Williams – computer scientist

=== Chemists ===
- Michael Barnett – theoretical chemist
- William Boon – chemist
- John Eddowes Bowman the Younger – chemist
- Philip Bunker – Canadian scientist and author
- Sir John Cadogan – President of the Royal Society of Chemistry
- Sir Arthur Herbert Church – chemist
- Leslie Crombie – chemist
- Charles Frederick Cross – chemist
- Richard Dixon – chemist
- Sir Arthur Duckham – President of the Institution of Chemical Engineers
- Henry John Horstman Fenton – chemist
- Victor Gold – chemist
- Leticia González – chemist
- Sir Herbert Jackson – chemist
- Mumtaz Ali Kazi – President of the Pakistan Academy of Sciences
- Augustine Ong – chemist
- Geoffrey Ozin – chemist
- Raymond Peters – chemist
- Eric Scerri – chemist
- Sir Jocelyn Field Thorpe – chemist

=== Earth scientists ===
- George Barrow – geologist
- Henry William Bristow – geologist
- David Edgar Cartwright – oceanographer
- Sir George Deacon – oceanographer
- Archibald Thomas John Dollar – geologist and seismologist
- David Lary – atmospheric scientist
- David Linton – geographer
- John Milne – inventor of the Seismometer
- Ukichiro Nakaya – glaciologist
- David Potts – geotechnical engineer
- Sir Arthur Russell, 6th Baronet – mineralogist
- Harry Bolton Seed – geotechnical engineer
- Sir Laurence Dudley Stamp – geographer and President of the Royal Geographical Society
- James Haward Taylor – President of the Mineralogical Society of Great Britain and Ireland
- Errol White – geologist and President of the Linnean Society of London
- Sidney Wooldridge – geologist and President of the Royal Geographical Society

=== Medicine ===
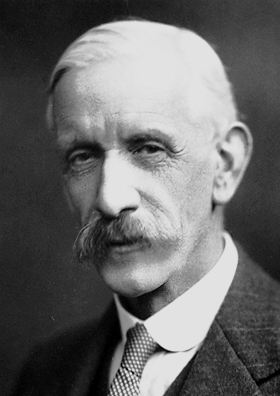
1929 Nobel Prize in Physiology or Medicine laureate and President of the Royal Society Sir Frederick Hopkins (Medicine)

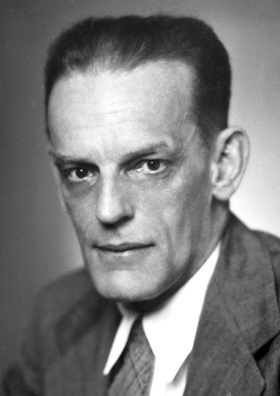
1951 Nobel Prize in Physiology or Medicine laureate Max Theiler (Medicine)

- Theodore Dyke Acland – surgeon and physician
- Francis Anstie – physician
- Eric Anson – anaesthetist
- Norman Ashton – ophthalmologist
- Simon Baron-Cohen – Director of the Autism Research Centre at the University of Cambridge
- Evan Buchanan Baxter – physician
- Dinesh Bhugra – President of the Royal College of Psychiatrists
- John Bienenstock – physician
- Sir William Bowman, 1st Baronet – histologist and anatomist
- Peter Brinsden – gynaecologist
- William Brinton – physician
- Russell Brock, Baron Brock – pioneer of modern open-heart surgery
- Thomas Gregor Brodie – physiologist
- Michael Burgess – coroner
- Geoffrey Burnstock – medical researcher
- Dame Jill Macleod Clark – nursing administrator
- Dame Jessica Corner – nurse
- Edgar Crookshank – physician and microbiologist
- William Broughton Davies – doctor
- John Leonard Dawson – Serjeant Surgeon to the Royal Household
- Sir Richard Doll – Shaw Prize laureate
- Annette Dolphin – pharmacologist
- Victor Dzau – President of Duke University Hospital
- Havelock Ellis – physician, sexual psychologist and social reformer
- Navina Evans – medical administrator and psychiatrist
- Dame Uta Frith – developmental psychologist
- Abraham Pineo Gesner – inventor of kerosene and physician
- Ben Goldacre – physician
- James Goolnik – dentist
- Thorrun Govind – pharmacist and solicitor
- Sir James Gowans – Wolf Prize in Medicine laureate
- Austin Gresham – pathologist
- Christopher Heath – surgeon
- Douglas Higgs – haematologist
- John Hilton – surgeon
- Thomas Hodgkin – pathologist and discoverer of Hodgkin's lymphoma
- Sir Frederick Hopkins – 1929 Nobel Prize in Physiology or Medicine laureate and President of the Royal Society
- Richard Houlston – Professor of Molecular genetics and Population genetics at the Institute of Cancer Research
- Joseph Graeme Humble – haematologist
- Thomas Inman – surgeon
- Sir George Johnson – physician
- Takaki Kanehiro – discoverer of the link between beriberi and diet
- David Kemp – audiologist
- Raymond Kirk – surgeon
- Paul Knapman – coroner
- Marios Kyriazis – gerontologist
- Sir Morell Mackenzie – physician
- Sir Charles James Martin – Director of the Lister Institute
- Wylie McKissock – neurosurgeon
- Harold Moody – physician
- Ludlow Moody – physician
- Sir Victor Negus – surgeon
- Edward Nettleship – ophthalmologist
- John Graham Nicholls – physiologist
- Kypros Nicolaides – fetal medicine pioneer, most cited OB/GYN in the world, professor of fetal medicine at King's
- Sir John Peel – gynecologist
- Lionel Penrose – psychiatrist and geneticist
- William D. Richardson – Director of the UCL Wolfson Institute
- Geoffrey Rose – ophthalmologist
- Ulrike Schmidt – psychiatrist
- Sir John Simon – Chief Medical Officer for HM Government
- Patrick Steptoe – pioneer of IVF who missed out on a Nobel Prize because he died before the awarding
- Sir George Adlington Syme – surgeon
- Thomas Pridgin Teale – surgeon and ophthalmologist
- Max Theiler – 1951 Nobel Prize in Physiology or Medicine laureate for developing a vaccine against yellow fever
- Sir St Clair Thomson – surgeon
- Sir Cecil Wakeley, 1st Baronet – surgeon
- Fredric Wertham – psychiatrist
- Edith Whetnall – surgeon
- Elsie Widdowson – dietitian
- Fiona Wood – plastic surgeon
- Anthony Yates – rheumatologist
- Sir R. A. Young – physician

=== Nurses ===
- Sir Jonathan Asbridge – first president of the UK's Nursing and Midwifery Council and director of Nursing NHS London
- Alice Fisher – nursing pioneer in the US at the Philadelphia General Hospital
- Florence Nightingale – established the first official nurses' training programme Nightingale School for Nurses, the founder of modern nursing
- Lucy Osburn – regarded as the founder of modern nursing in Australia
- Kofoworola Abeni Pratt – became Chief Nursing Officer of Nigeria
- Emmy Rappe – founded the Swedish Nursing Association
- Linda Richards – first professionally trained American nurse, a pioneer of individual patients' medical records and established programmes in US and Japan
- Dame Cicely Saunders – established the first modern hospice St Christopher's Hospice, pioneer of palliative care
- Isla Stewart – became the matron of St Bartholomew's Hospital and founded the Royal British Nurses Association
- Henny Tscherning – became president of the Danish Nurses' Organization
- Theodora Turner – nurse superintendent of St Thomas' Hospital (during reconstruction after the Blitz), became president of Royal College of Nursing

=== Physicists and astronomers ===
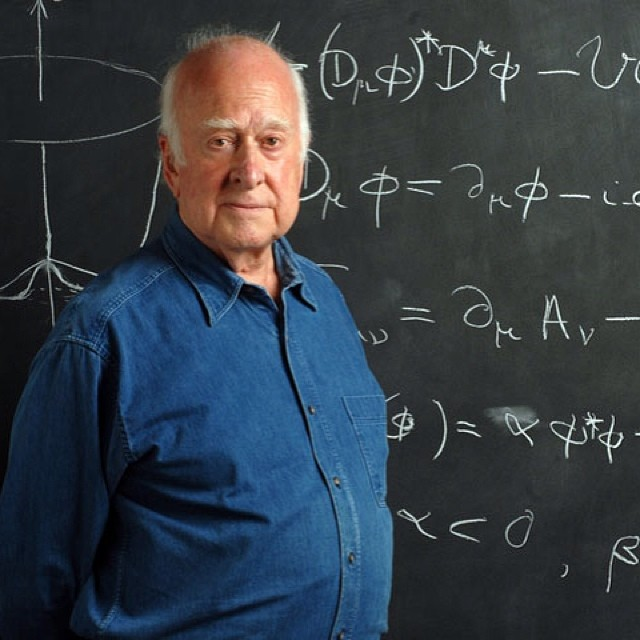
Theorist of the Higgs boson and winner of the 2013 Nobel Prize in Physics Peter Higgs (BSc, 1950; MSc, 1952; PhD, 1954)

- Ronald Burge – physicist
- Leigh Canham – optoelectronics physicist
- Eva Crane – mathematician and physicist who became world expert on bees
- Andrew Fabian – President of the Royal Astronomical Society
- Frank Farmer – physicist
- Michael Fisher – Wolf Prize in Physics laureate
- Marcelo Gleiser – physicist and astronomer
- Peter Higgs – proposer of the Higgs boson and 2013 Nobel Prize in Physics laureate
- Basil Hiley – Bohmian quantum physicist
- Francis Jones – physicist
- Claudio Maccone – space scientist
- Donald MacCrimmon MacKay – physicist
- Edward Walter Maunder – astronomer
- John Edwin Midwinter – President of the Institution of Electrical Engineers
- William Allen Miller – astronomer and chemist
- John Robert Mills – radar pioneer
- Ali Moustafa Mosharafa – theoretical physicist
- Raja Ramanna – physicist
- Simon Saunders – philosopher of physics
- Edward James Stone – President of the Royal Astronomical Society
- Louis Slotin – nuclear physicist who took part to the Manhattan Project
- David Tong – theoretical physicist
- Boris Townsend – physicist
- Kumar Wickramasinghe – electrical engineer

=== Zoologists ===
- Hilda Margaret Bruce – zoologist
- Peter Martin Duncan – palaeontologist
- Alfred Henry Garrod – vertebrate zoologist
- Frederick Hutton – zoologist
- Janet Kear – ornithologist
- Dame Miriam Rothschild – zoologist and entomologist
- Adam Sedgwick – zoologist
- Robert Walter Campbell Shelford – entomologist
- Sir Eric Smith – zoologist
- Henry Tibbats Stainton – entomologist
- Thomas Stebbing – zoologist

== Mathematicians ==
- David Acheson – mathematician
- Colin Bushnell – mathematician
- Keith Devlin – mathematician
- Graham Everest – mathematician
- Aubrey William Ingleton – mathematician
- Leon Mirsky – mathematician
- Sir Martin Taylor – mathematician
- Henry William Watson – mathematician
- Tom Willmore – geometer

== Religion ==
=== Archbishop, Primates and religious leaders ===
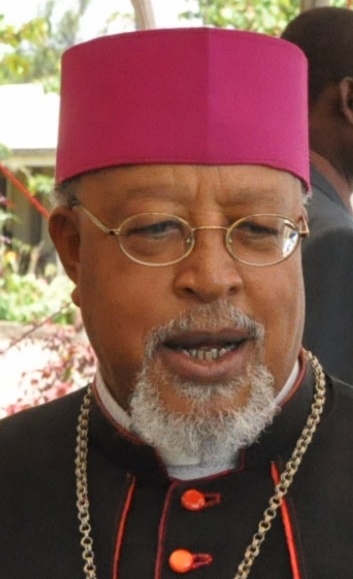
Catholic Archbishop of Addis Abeba Cardinal Berhaneyesus Demerew Souraphiel

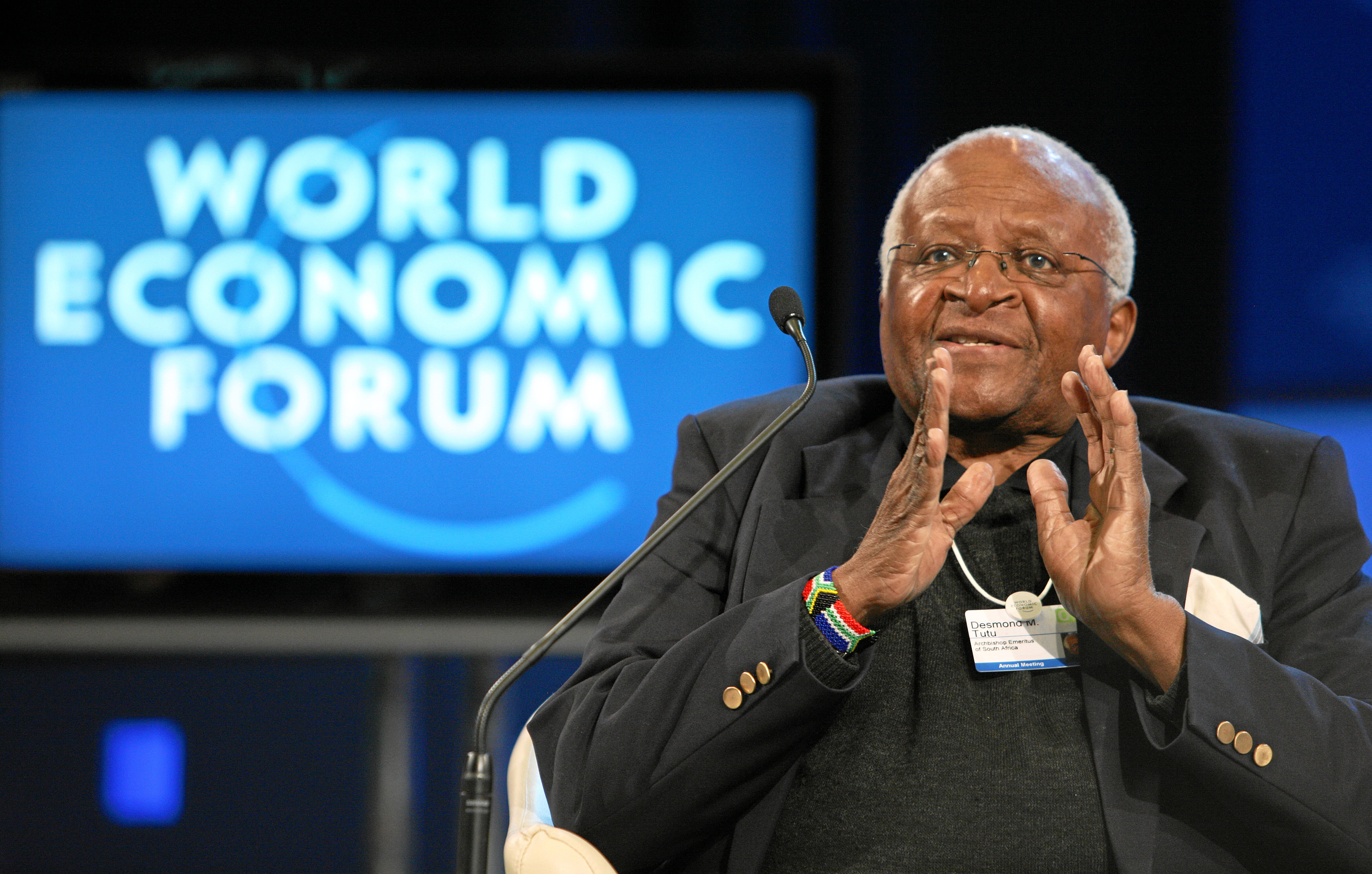
Archbishop Desmond Tutu (BD, 1965, MTh 1966) was awarded the Nobel Peace Prize in 1984

- Joseph Abiodun Adetiloye – Primate of Nigeria
- Richard Clarke – Archbishop of Armagh and Primate of All Ireland
- Joost de Blank – Archbishop of Cape Town
- John Holder – Archbishop of the West Indies
- Churchill Julius – Archbishop of New Zealand
- Ted Luscombe – Primus of the Scottish Episcopal Church
- Tom Morgan – Archbishop of Saskatoon
- Njongonkulu Ndungane – Archbishop of Cape Town
- Jonathan Sacks, Baron Sacks – former Chief Rabbi of the United Kingdom and Crossbench Peer
- Berhaneyesus Demerew Souraphiel – Catholic cardinal and Archbishop of Addis Abeba
- Desmond Tutu – Archbishop of Cape Town and 1984 Nobel Peace Prize laureate

=== Bishops ===
- Cyril Abeynaike – Bishop of Colombo
- James Adams – Bishop of Barking
- Gabriel Akinbolarin Akinbiyi – Bishop of Offa and Akoko
- D. J. Ambalavanar – Bishop of Jaffna
- Godfrey Ashby – Bishop of St John's
- David Atkinson – Bishop of Thetford
- Harold Beardmore – Bishop of St Helena
- Paul Barnett – Bishop of North Sydney
- Hibbert Binney – Bishop of Nova Scotia
- Richard Blunt – Bishop of Hull
- Derek Bond – Bishop of Bradwell
- David Bonser – Bishop of Bolton
- Christopher Boyle – Bishop of Northern Malawi
- Harold Bradfield – Bishop of Bath and Wells
- John Broadhurst – Bishop of Fulham
- Michael Campbell – Bishop of Lancaster
- Edward Cannan – Bishop of St Helena
- Noel Chamberlain – Bishop of Trinidad and Tobago
- Richard Cheetham – Bishop of Kingston upon Thames
- Peter Coleman – Bishop of Crediton
- Eric Cordingly – Bishop of Thetford
- Frederick Courtney – Bishop of Nova Scotia
- Thomas Craske – Bishop of Gibraltar
- Anthony Crockett – Bishop of Bangor
- Richard Cutts – Bishop of Argentina and Eastern South America
- Tim Dakin – Bishop of Winchester
- Anne Dyer – Bishop of Aberdeen and Orkney
- Peter Eaton – Bishop of Southeast Florida
- Philip Egan – Bishop of Portsmouth
- Tim Ellis – Bishop of Grantham
- Ghislain Emmanuel – Bishop of Mauritius
- Ralph Emmerson – Bishop of Knaresborough
- Graham Foley – Bishop of Reading
- Richard Garrard – Bishop of Penrith
- Hugh Gilbert – Bishop of Aberdeen
- William Godfrey – Bishop of Peru and Uruguay
- Laurie Green – Bishop of Bradwell
- Sehon Goodridge – Bishop of the Windward Islands
- David Halsey – Bishop of Carlisle & Tonbridge
- Mike Harrison – Bishop of Dunwich
- Peter Hatendi – Bishop of Mashonaland
- Sir Christopher Hill – Bishop of Guildford
- Edward Holland – Bishop of Gibraltar & Colchester
- Nick Holtam – Bishop of Salisbury
- Alan Hopes – Bishop of East Anglia
- John Hudson – Bishop of Carpentaria
- Peter Hullah – Bishop of Ramsbury
- Henry Huxtable – Bishop of Mauritius
- Martyn Jarrett – Bishop of Beverley
- David Jennings – Bishop of Warrington
- Akinpelu Johnson – Bishop of Lagos Mainland
- Graeme Knowles – Bishop of Sodor and Man and Dean of St Paul's
- Richard Lewis – Bishop of Taunton & St Edmundsbury and Ipswich
- Christopher Lowson – Bishop of Lincoln
- Francis McDougall – Bishop of Labuan and Sarawak
- Lloyd Morrell – Bishop of Lewes
- Theo Naledi – Bishop of Botswana and Matabeleland
- Keith Newton – Bishop of Richborough
- John Neale – Bishop of Ramsbury
- Jack Nicholls – Bishop of Sheffield & Lancaster
- Ivor Norris – Bishop of Brandon
- Stephen Oliver – Bishop of Stepney
- Kenneth Oram – Bishop of Grahamstown
- Geoffrey Paul – Bishop of Bradford & Hull
- John Perumbalath – Bishop of Bradwell & Liverpool
- Andrew Proud – Bishop of Reading
- Gavin Reid – Bishop of Maidstone
- Alan Rogers – Bishop of Mauritius, Fulham & Colchester
- David Rossdale – Bishop of Grimsby
- Andrew Rumsey – Bishop of Ramsbury
- Roy Screech – Bishop of St Germans
- Peter Selby – Bishop of Kingston and Worcester
- Ronald Shapley – Bishop of the Windward Islands
- Martin Shaw – Bishop of Argyll and the Isles
- Ronald Shepherd – Bishop of British Columbia
- David Smith – Bishop of Bradford & Maidstone
- Mark Sowerby – Bishop of Horsham
- Robert Springett – Bishop of Tewkesbury
- Frederic Stanford – Bishop of Cariboo
- John Strachan – Bishop of Rangoon
- Tim Thornton – Bishop of Sherborne & Truro
- Eric Treacy – Bishop of Wakefield & Pontefract
- John Trillo – Bishop of Bedford, Chelmsford & Hertford
- Clayton Twitchell – Bishop of Polynesia
- Michael Volland – Bishop of Birmingham
- Dominic Walker – Bishop of Monmouth
- Martin Wallace – Bishop of Selby
- Ambrose Weekes – Bishop of Gibraltar
- Rob Wickham – Bishop of Edmonton
- Edward Wilkinson – Bishop of Zululand and Europe

=== Archdeacons ===
- Geoffrey Arrand – Archdeacon of Suffolk
- Simon Baker – Archdeacon of Lichfield
- Frank Bentley – Archdeacon of Worcester
- Thomas Browne – Archdeacon of Ipswich
- Michael Bucks – Chaplain of the Fleet
- Roger Bush – Archdeacon of Cornwall
- Mark Butchers – Archdeacon of Barnstaple
- Ian Chandler – Archdeacon of Plymouth
- Jesse Clayson – Archdeacon of Croydon
- Roger Combes – Archdeacon of Horsham
- Peter Delaney – Archdeacon of London
- Andrew Doughty – Archdeacon of Bermuda
- Michael Everitt – Archdeacon of Lancaster
- Christopher Futcher – Archdeacon of Exeter
- Paul Gardner – Archdeacon of Exeter
- Ian Gatford – Archdeacon of Derby
- Malcolm Grundy – Archdeacon of Craven
- Armstrong Hall – Archdeacon of Richmond
- Michael Harley – Archdeacon of Winchester
- Alun Hawkins – Archdeacon of Bangor
- John Hawkins – Archdeacon of Hampstead
- John Hawley – Archdeacon of Blackburn
- Bob Jeffery – Archdeacon of Salop, Dean of Worcester
- David Jenkins – Archdeacon of Westmorland and Furness
- Clifford Lacey – Archdeacon of Lewisham
- Rosemary Lain-Priestley – Archdeacon for the Two Cities
- Giles Legood – Chaplain-in-Chief of the Royal Air Force
- Leonard Moss – Archdeacon of Hereford
- Michael Nott – Archdeacon of Maidstone & Canterbury
- Niel Nye – Archdeacon of Maidstone
- Mark Oakley – Archdeacon of Germany and Northern Europe
- Arnold Picton – Archdeacon of Blackburn
- Charles Pinder – Archdeacon of Lambeth
- William Prior – Archdeacon of Bodmin
- John Rawlings – Archdeacon of Totnes
- John Reed – Archdeacon of Taunton
- Stephen Roberts – Archdeacon of Wandsworth
- Harry Saunders – Archdeacon of Macclesfield
- David Sharples – Archdeacon of Salford
- Ernest Henry Shears – Archdeacon of Durban
- Benjamin Smith – Archdeacon of Maidstone
- Jonathan Smith – Archdeacon of St Albans
- Roy Southwell – Archdeacon of Northolt
- David Sutch – Archdeacon of Gibraltar
- Edward Taylor – Archdeacon of Warwick
- Charles Tonks – Archdeacon of Croydon
- Robin Turner – Chaplain-in-Chief of the Royal Air Force
- David Waller – Archdeacon of Gibraltar, Italy and Malta
- Henry Watkins – Archdeacon of Durham, Northumberland and Auckland
- Alfred Wright – Archdeacon of Waimea
- Paul Wright – Archdeacon of Bromley & Bexley

=== Deans ===
- Francis Austin – Dean of St George's Cathedral, Georgetown
- Stuart Babbage – Dean of Sydney and Dean of Melbourne
- Grahame Baker – Dean of Ontario
- Roy Barker – Dean of Grahamstown
- Mark Beach – Dean of Rochester
- Trevor Beeson – Dean of Winchester
- Jonathan Brewster – Dean of Carlisle
- David Brindley – Dean of Portsmouth
- Edward Carpenter – Dean of Westminster
- Philip Cecil – Dean of Belize
- Michael Chandler – Dean of Ely
- Clifford Chapman – Dean of Exeter
- Neil Collings – Dean of St Edmundsbury
- Adrian Dorber – Dean of Lichfield
- Frederick Cogman – Dean of Guernsey
- Frederic Farrar – Dean of Canterbury and Master of Marlborough College
- Gerald Field – Dean of Cashel
- Dianna Gwilliams – Dean of Guildford
- Frederic Harton – Dean of Wells
- Joe Hawes – Dean of St Edmundsbury
- Philip Hesketh – Dean of Rochester
- David Ison – Dean of St Paul's
- Trevor James – Dean of Dunedin
- Walter Jenks – Dean of Moray, Ross and Caithness
- Martin Kitchen – Dean of Derby
- Marcus Knight – Dean of Exeter
- John Lang – Dean of Lichfield
- Walter Matthews – Dean of St Paul's
- George Nairn-Briggs – Dean of Wakefield
- Martyn Percy – Dean of Christ Church
- Ken Robinson – Dean of Gibraltar
- Ronald Sargison – Dean of St George's Cathedral, Georgetown
- Paul Shackerley – Dean of Brecon
- Colin Slee – Dean of Southwark
- Rowan Smith – Dean of Cape Town
- Victor Stock – Dean of Guildford
- Michael Tavinor – Dean of Hereford
- Lister Tonge – Dean of Monmouth
- John Wattie – Dean of Aberdeen and Orkney
- Michael Webber – Dean of Hobart
- Jeremy Winston – Dean of Monmouth

=== Other religious figures ===
- Heidi Baker – Christian missionary
- Muhammad Abdul Bari – Secretary General of the Muslim Council of Britain
- Shaw Clifton – General of The Salvation Army
- Richard Coles – priest, musician and journalist
- Leonard Coulshaw – Chaplain of the Fleet
- Frank Curtis – Provost of Sheffield
- Pelham Dale – Ritualist clergyman
- Rob Frost – Methodist evangelist
- Robert Gandell – biblical scholar
- Donald Gray – clergyman
- Walter Homolka – rabbi
- Donald Howard – Provost of St Andrew's Cathedral, Aberdeen
- Lawrence Jackson – Provost of Blackburn
- Eric James – Chaplain Extraordinary to HM the Queen
- Gordon Kinnell – Provost of St Andrew's Cathedral, Aberdeen
- Kenneth Leech – priest
- Peter Mallett – Chaplain-General to the Forces
- Stephen Need – religious author and former Dean of St. George's College, Jerusalem
- Hugh Smith – Chaplain-General of Prisons
- Frederick Spurrell – priest and archaeologist

== Arts and media ==
=== Authors ===
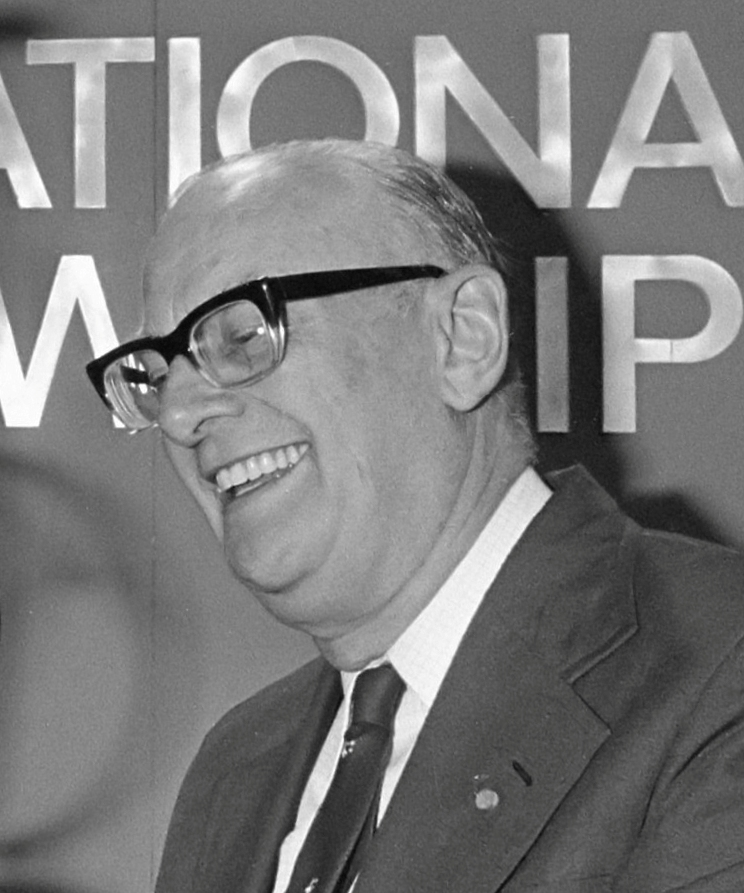
Science fiction writer Sir Arthur C. Clarke (BSc, 1948)

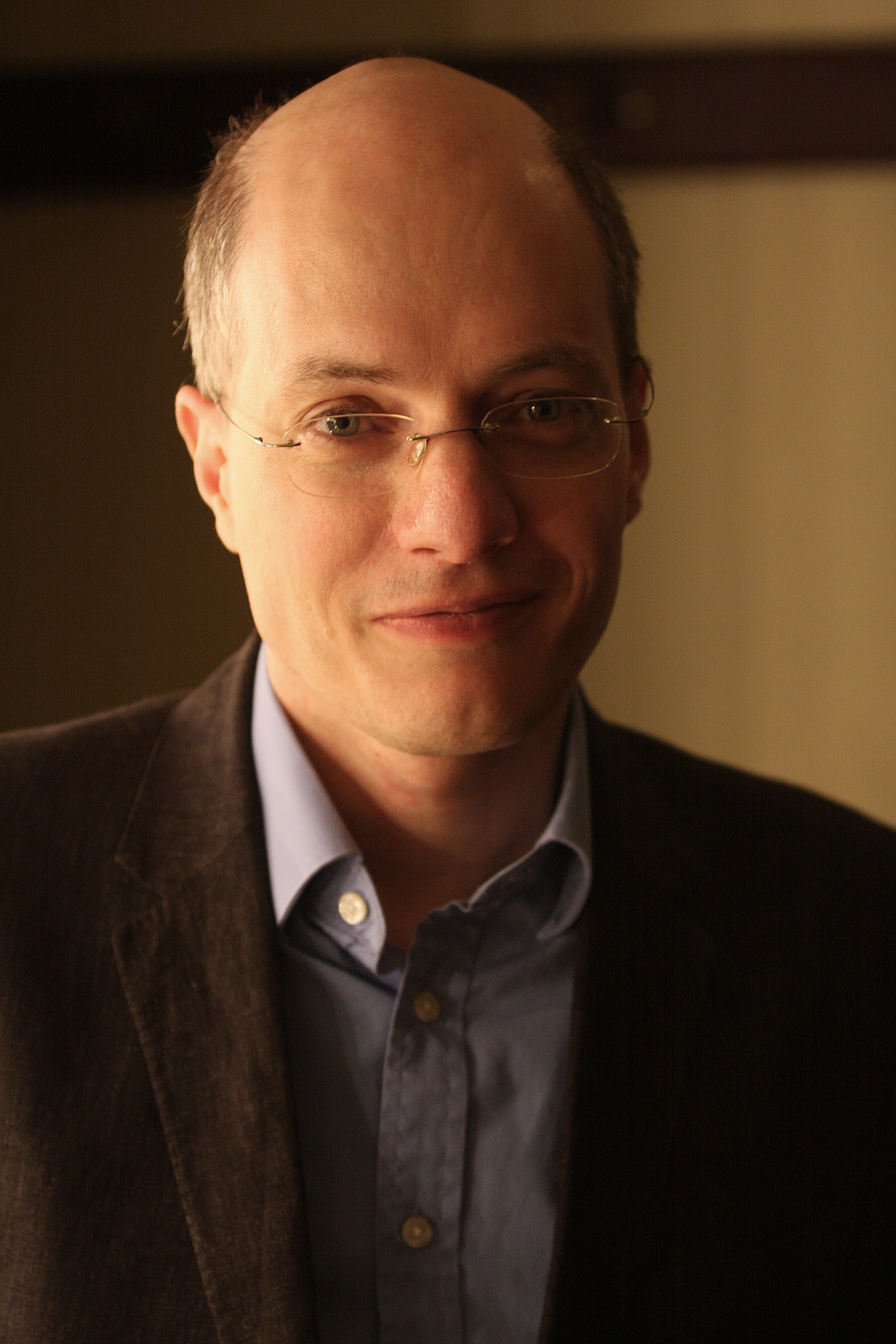
Writer and philosopher Alain de Botton (MPhil, 1992)

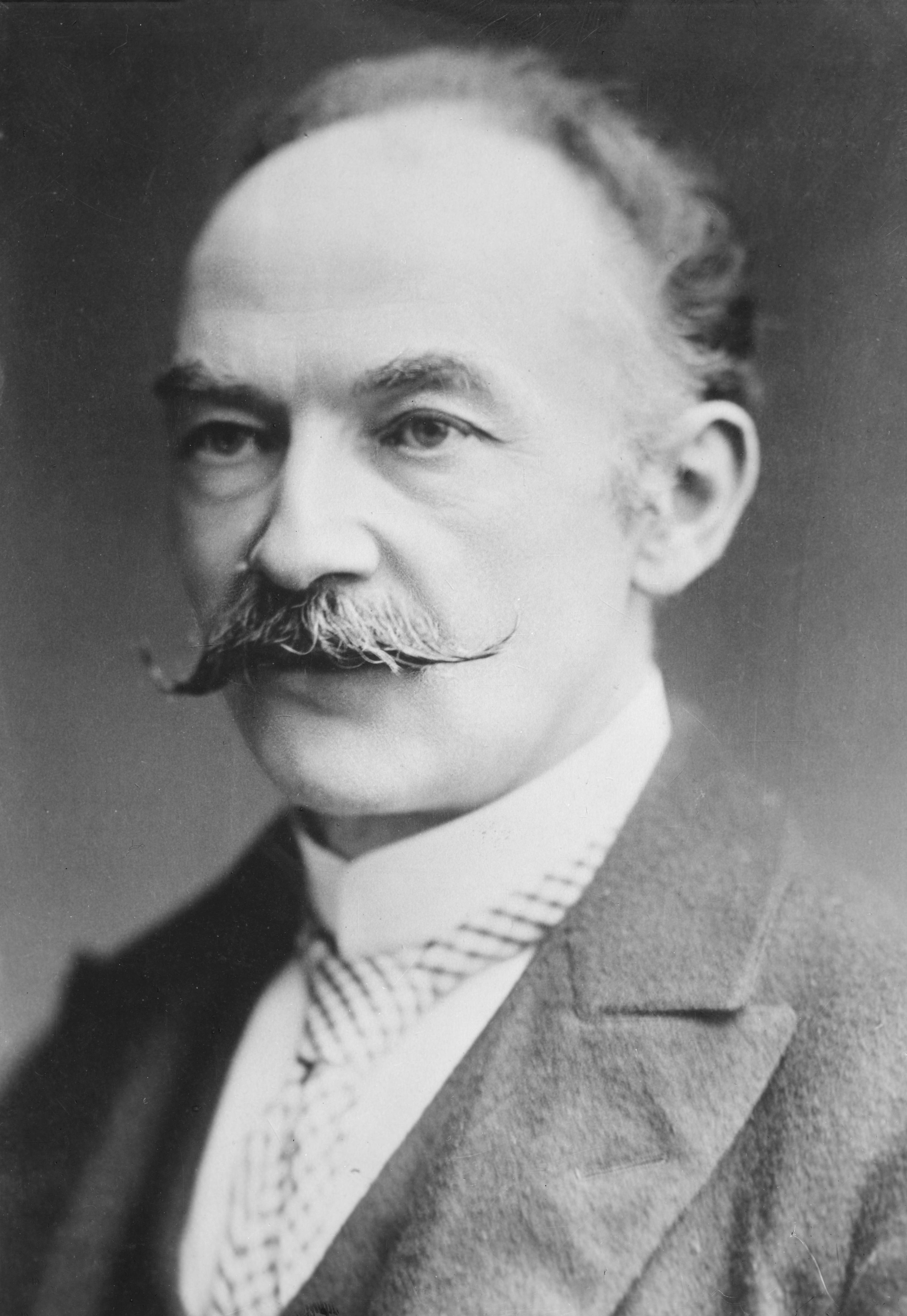
Novelist and poet Thomas Hardy (French, 1863)

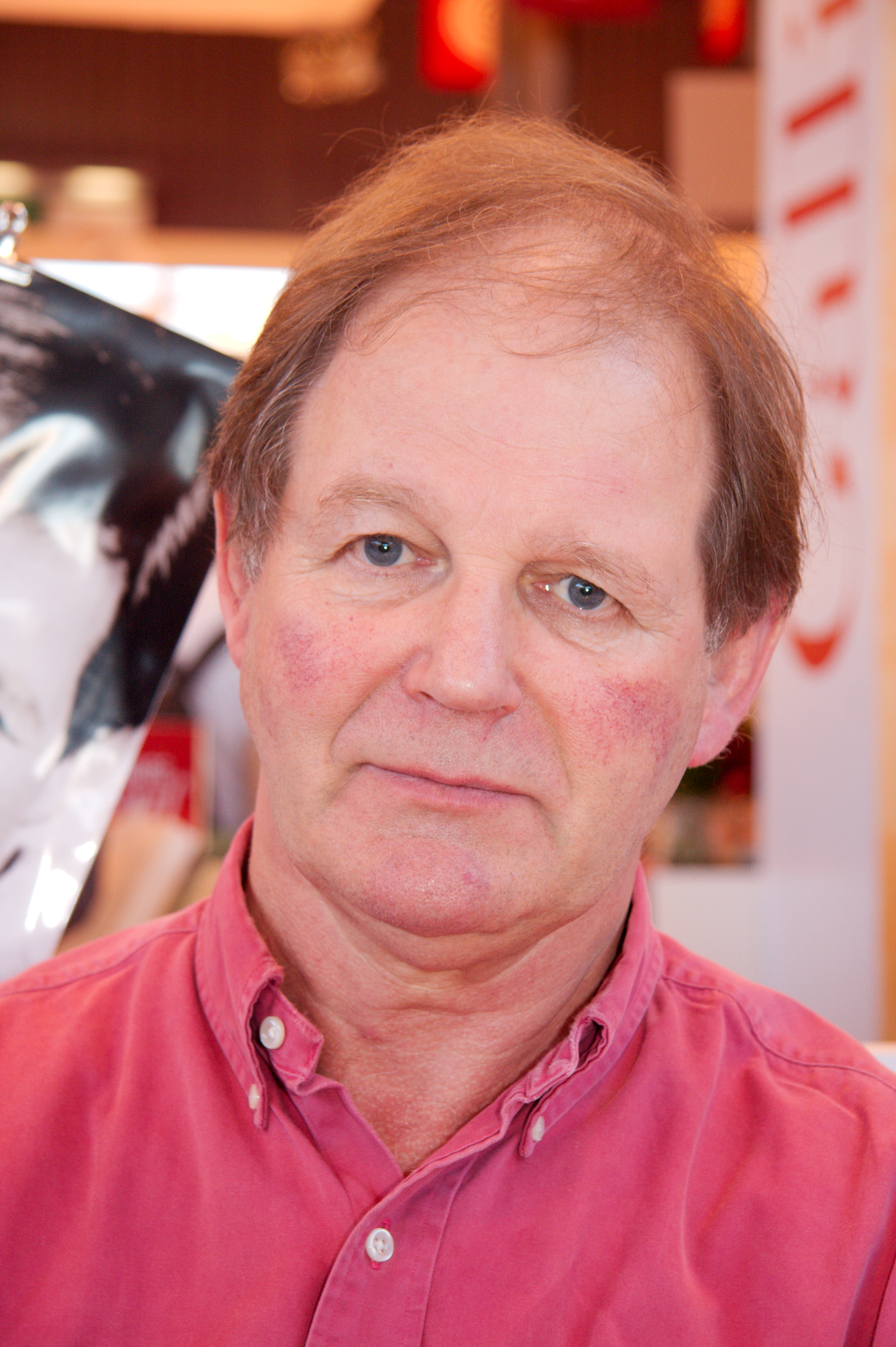
Author and poet Sir Michael Morpurgo (BA, 1967)

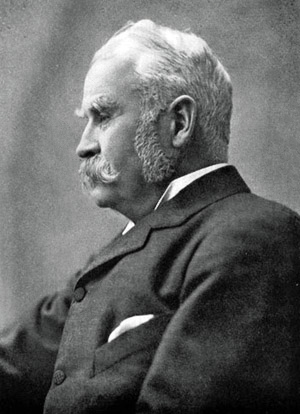
Dramatist Sir W. S. Gilbert of Gilbert and Sullivan (BA, 1856)

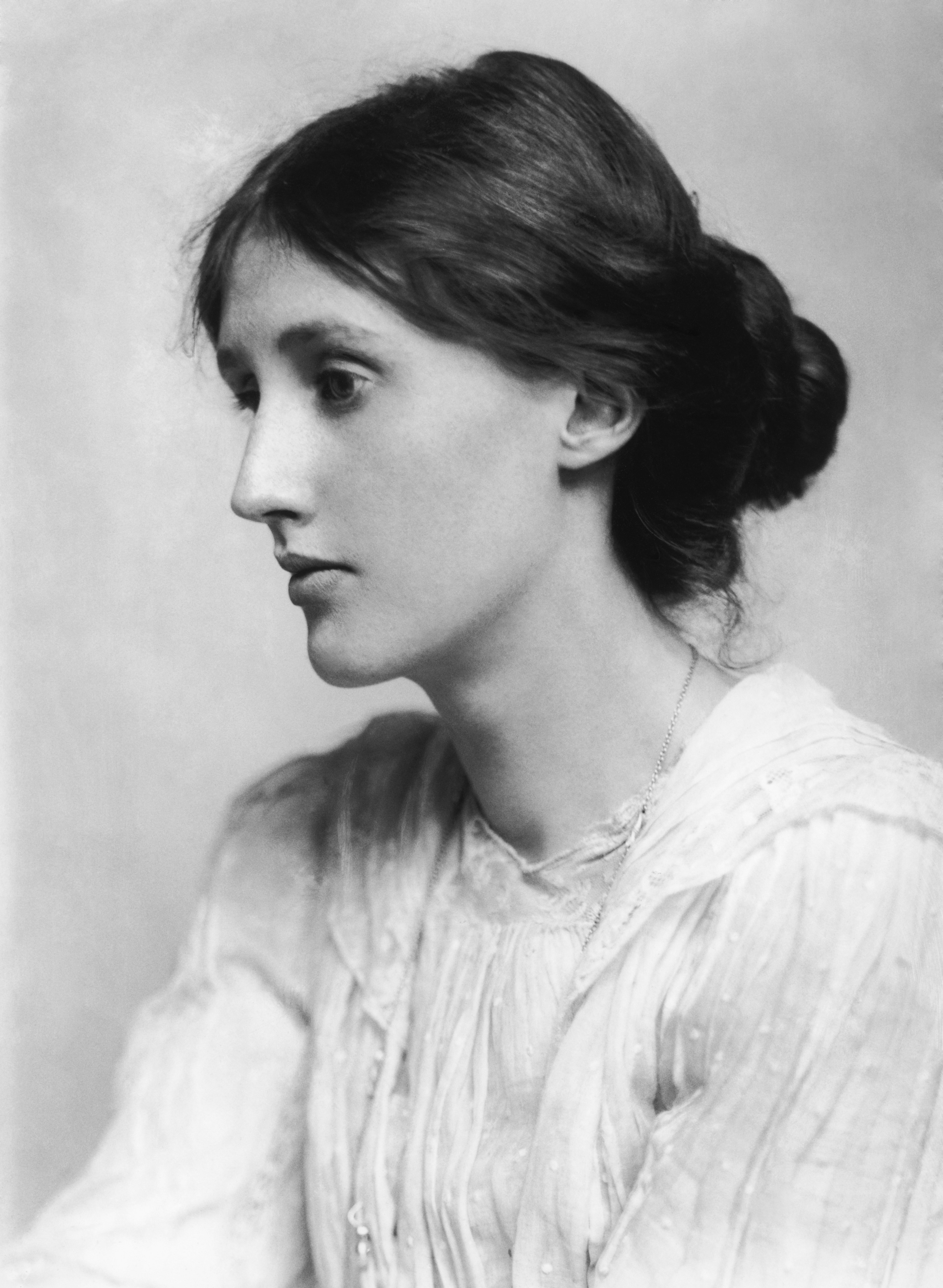
Writer Virginia Woolf (Languages, 1901)

- Dannie Abse – writer and poet
- John Adair – author
- Alfred Ainger – biographer and critic
- Lyman Andrews – poet
- Sir Edwin Arnold – poet and journalist
- William Beal – religious writer
- Stephen Benatar – author
- Ronan Bennett – novelist and screenwriter
- Tamasin Berry-Hart – novelist
- Sir Walter Besant – novelist, historian and academic
- Shahbano Bilgrami – novelist and poet
- Alain de Botton – writer, philosopher and television producer
- Patrick Braybrooke – literary critic
- Paula Broadwell – biographer of David Petraeus
- Charles Brookfield – playwright and actor
- Anita Brookner – Booker Prize-winning novelist
- Jonathan Buckley - writer
- Sir Arthur C. Clarke – science fiction writer and inventor
- Helen Cresswell – children's author and screenwriter
- Quentin Crisp – writer
- Sir George Webbe Dasent – writer
- Mike Dash – writer and journalist
- Ebou Dibba – novelist
- Alison Dolling – writer
- Jane Draycott – poet
- Maureen Duffy – novelist, poet and screenwriter
- Andreas Embirikos – poet
- Charles Finger – author
- C. S. Forester – historical novelist
- John Fraser – novelist and poet
- Daniel Foxx – comedian, social media influencer, and author
- Sir W. S. Gilbert – one half of Gilbert and Sullivan
- Tariq Goddard – novelist
- Bea Gonzalez – novelist and lecturer
- Bill Griffiths – poet
- Radclyffe Hall – poet and author
- Thomas Hardy – novelist and poet
- Eileen Hayes – author, columnist
- Constance Heaven – novelist and actress
- Dame Susan Hill – novelist
- Molly Holden – poet
- Africanus Horton – writer
- Susan Howatch – author
- Simon Ings – novelist
- Christopher Isherwood – novelist
- Storm Jameson – novelist
- B. S. Johnson – novelist
- Nihan Kaya – novelist
- John Keats – Romantic poet
- Garry Kilworth – novelist
- Charles Kingsley – novelist
- Henry Kingsley – novelist
- Hanif Kureishi – Whitbread Award-winning author and screenwriter
- Katherine Langrish – author
- Molly Lefebure – writer
- Marina Lewycka – novelist
- Thomas Macknight – biographer
- Sabrina Mahfouz – poet and playwright
- Menon Marath – novelist
- Alexander Masters – Whitbread Award-winning author and screenwriter
- W. Somerset Maugham – novelist and playwright
- Ronald Brunlees McKerrow – Shakespearean biographer
- James Miller – novelist
- Henry Morley – writer and academic
- Sir Michael Morpurgo – writer
- Desidério Murcho – writer
- Lawrence Norfolk – novelist
- Kathleen Nott – novelist and poet
- Chibundu Onuzo – novelist
- Ann Pilling – author and poet
- Barry Pilton – novelist and screenwriter
- Ross Raisin – novelist
- Vernon Richards – anarchist editor and author
- Anne Ridler – poet
- Michael Roberts – poet, writer and broadcaster
- John Ruskin – author, poet, artist, art critic and social critic
- John Ralston Saul – writer
- Frederick George Scott – poet
- Anne Sebba – writer
- Khushwant Singh – writer and Member of the Indian Rajya Sabha
- Elizabeth Smart – novelist and poet
- Jon Hunter Spence – Jane Austen scholar
- John Stammers – poet and writer
- Sir Leslie Stephen – author and mountaineer
- Robin Stevens – children's author
- Rosemary Timperley – novelist
- Frederick Augustus Voigt – writer
- David Watmough – novelist, playwright and academic
- Michael White – writer
- Virginia Woolf – novelist and essayist
- Sylvia Wynter – writer

=== Media, entertainment, film and theatre ===
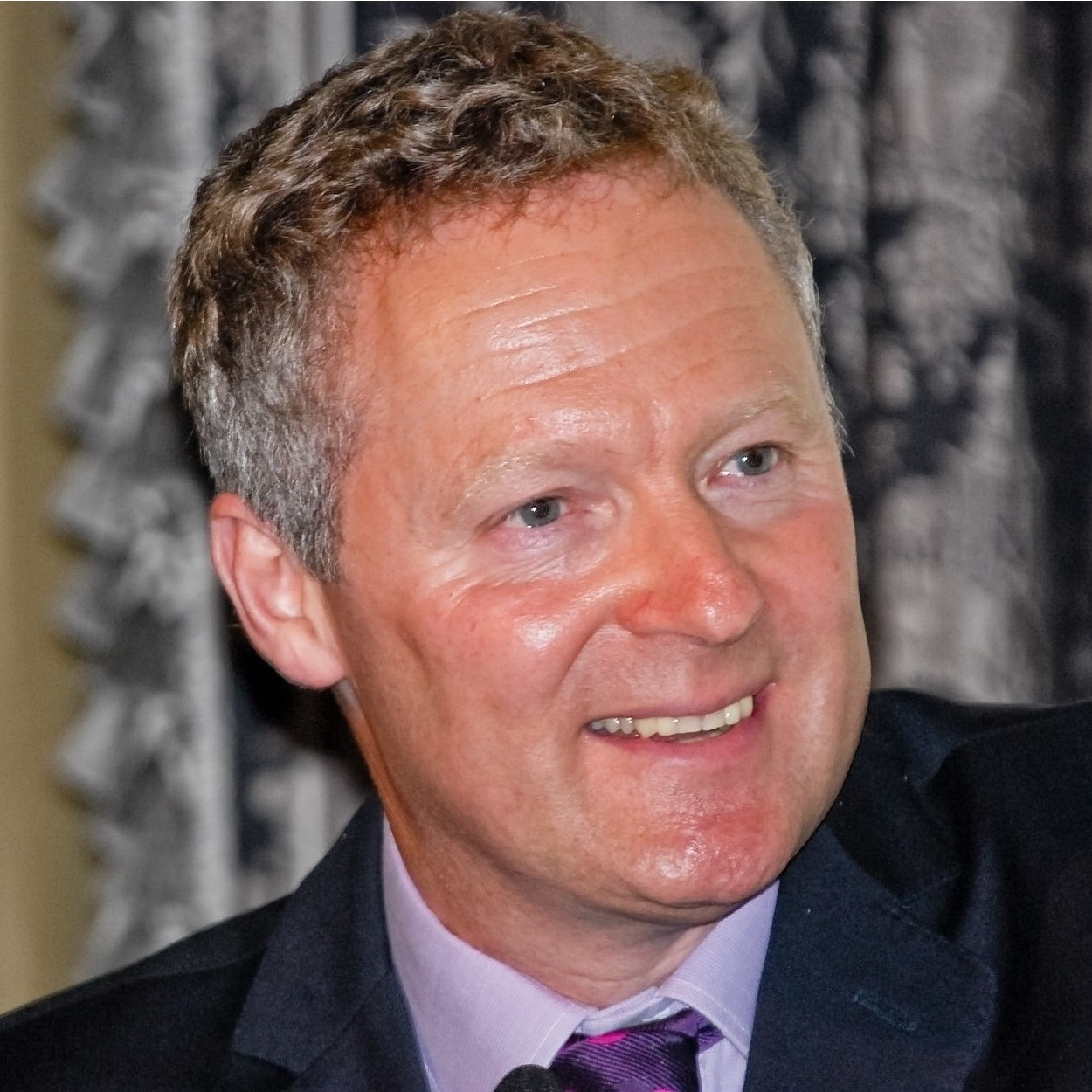
Impressionist and comedian Rory Bremner (BA, 1984)

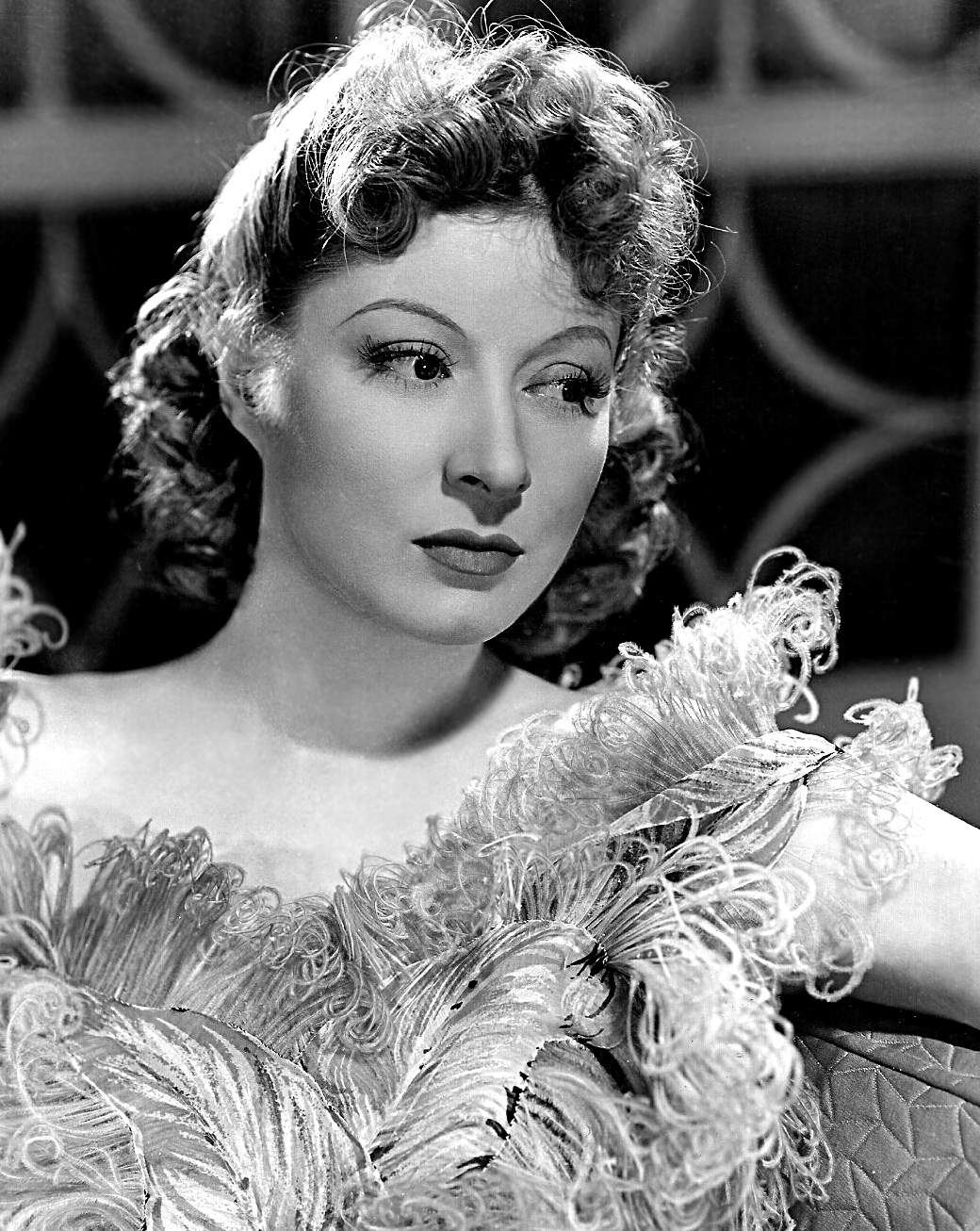
Oscar-winning actress Greer Garson (BA, 1926)

- Adewale Akinnuoye-Agbaje – actor
- Andrew Alexander – actor
- Sheila Atim – actress
- Juliet Aubrey – actress
- Michael Barry – BBC executive
- Emily Berrington – actress
- Georgina Bouzova – actress
- Rory Bremner – impressionist
- Herbert Brenon – film director
- Sue Carpenter – television presenter
- Nazrin Choudhury – screenwriter
- Bijan Daneshmand – actor and film director
- Gregory de Polnay – actor
- Leonard Fenton – actor
- Graeme Garden – actor and comedian
- Greer Garson – actress
- Sacha Gervasi – screenwriter
- Edmund Gwenn – actor
- Janice Hadlow – Controller of BBC Two
- Jason Hall – playwright
- Aiysha Hart – actress
- Sean Holmes – theatre director
- Sir Barry Ife – Principal of Guildhall School of Music and Drama
- Derek Jarman – film director
- Boris Karloff – actor
- Henry Kemble – actor
- Ella Marchment – opera director
- Jamila Massey – actress
- Jez Nelson – broadcaster
- Sir Allan Powell – Chairman of the BBC (1939–1946)
- Clifford Rose – actor
- Tom Rosenthal – actor and comedian
- Ashraf Safdar – actor and journalist
- Banita Sandhu – Bollywood actress
- Rish Shah – actor
- Darwin Shaw – actor
- Jack Shep - actor and comedian
- Ceri Sherlock – Welsh theatre and film director
- Robert J. Sherman – American theatre songwriter
- Jane Tranter – BBC executive
- Bree Turner – actress
- Charlotte Wells – film director
- Sir Charles Wyndham – actor

=== Journalists ===
==== Editors ====
- Christian Broughton – editor of The Independent
- Cyril Kenneth Bird – editor of Punch and cartoonist
- John Delane – editor of The Times
- Sydney Jacobson, Baron Jacobson – editor of The Sun
- Baxter Langley – editor of the Morning Star
- Hargreaves Parkinson – editor of The Financial Times
- Farrah Storr – editor of Cosmopolitan (UK)

==== Other journalists ====
- Anita Anand – journalist
- Ruaridh Arrow – journalist and film maker
- Martin Bashir – journalist
- Lisa Brennan-Jobs – journalist, daughter of Steve Jobs
- Sana Bucha – journalist & anchor
- David Bond – sports journalist
- Michael Bukht – radio executive
- James Chau – journalist and UN goodwill ambassador
- Benjamin Cohen – Channel 4 News correspondent
- Jane Corbin – BBC Panorama journalist
- Charlet Duboc – journalist
- Ayesha Durgahee – journalist
- Gwynne Dyer – journalist and military historian
- Sean Fletcher – journalist
- Daniel Ford – journalist, novelist and military historian
- Matthew Halton – journalist
- Ellie Harrison – BBC journalist
- Georgina Henry – journalist
- George Hills – journalist
- Cecil Hunt – journalist
- Francine Lacqua – Bloomberg Television anchor
- Sophie Long – BBC News journalist
- Diana Magnay – Sky News journalist
- Jonathan Maitland – journalist
- Ira Mathur – journalist
- Chapman Pincher – journalist
- Claire Rayner – journalist and agony aunt
- Roger Royle – radio broadcaster
- John Sandes – journalist and author
- Isa Soares – CNN news anchor and journalist
- Nicholas Stuart – journalist
- Ayshah Tull – Channel 4 News correspondent

=== Musicians ===
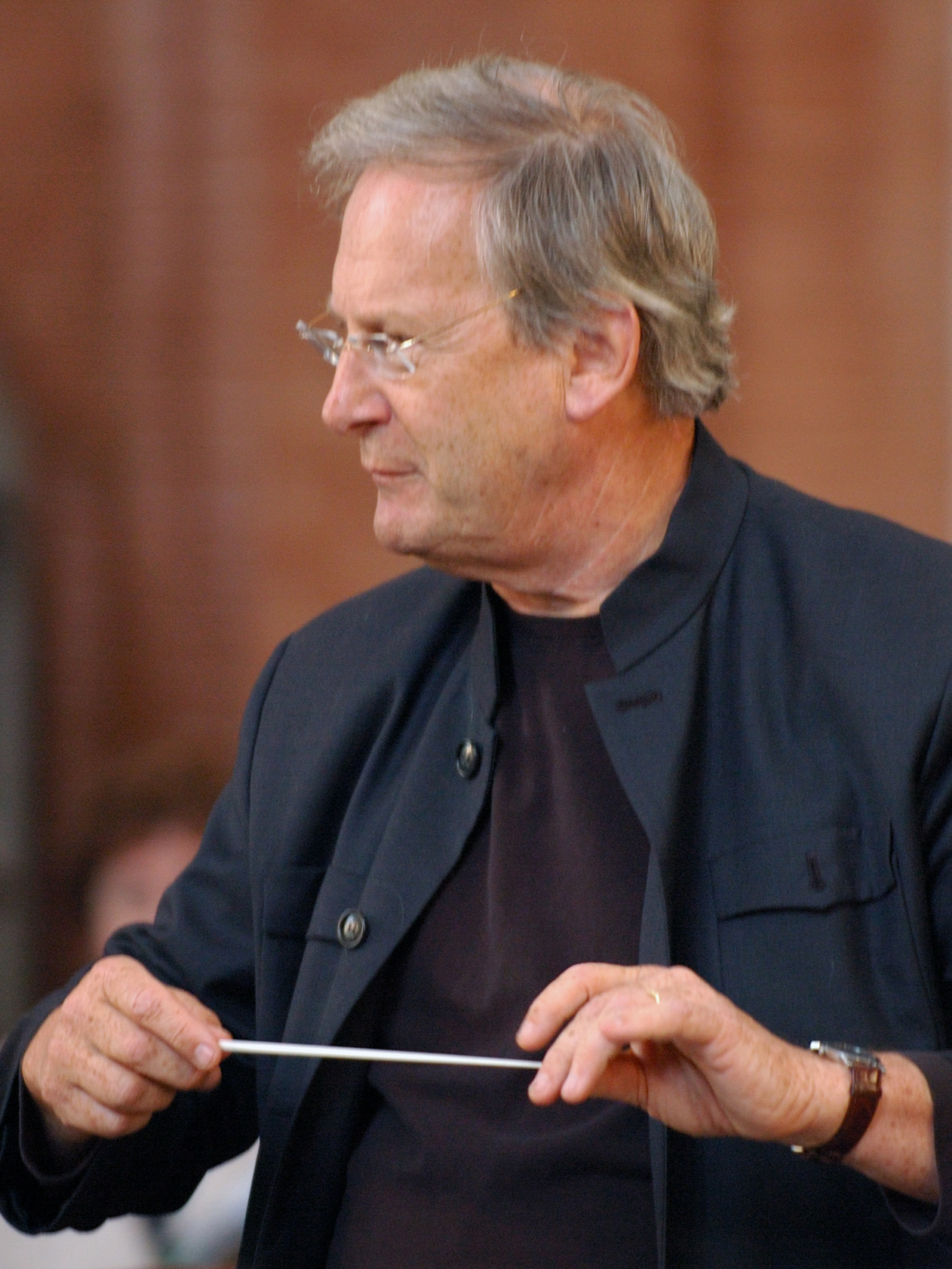
Grammy Award-winning conductor Sir John Eliot Gardiner (CAMS, 1966)

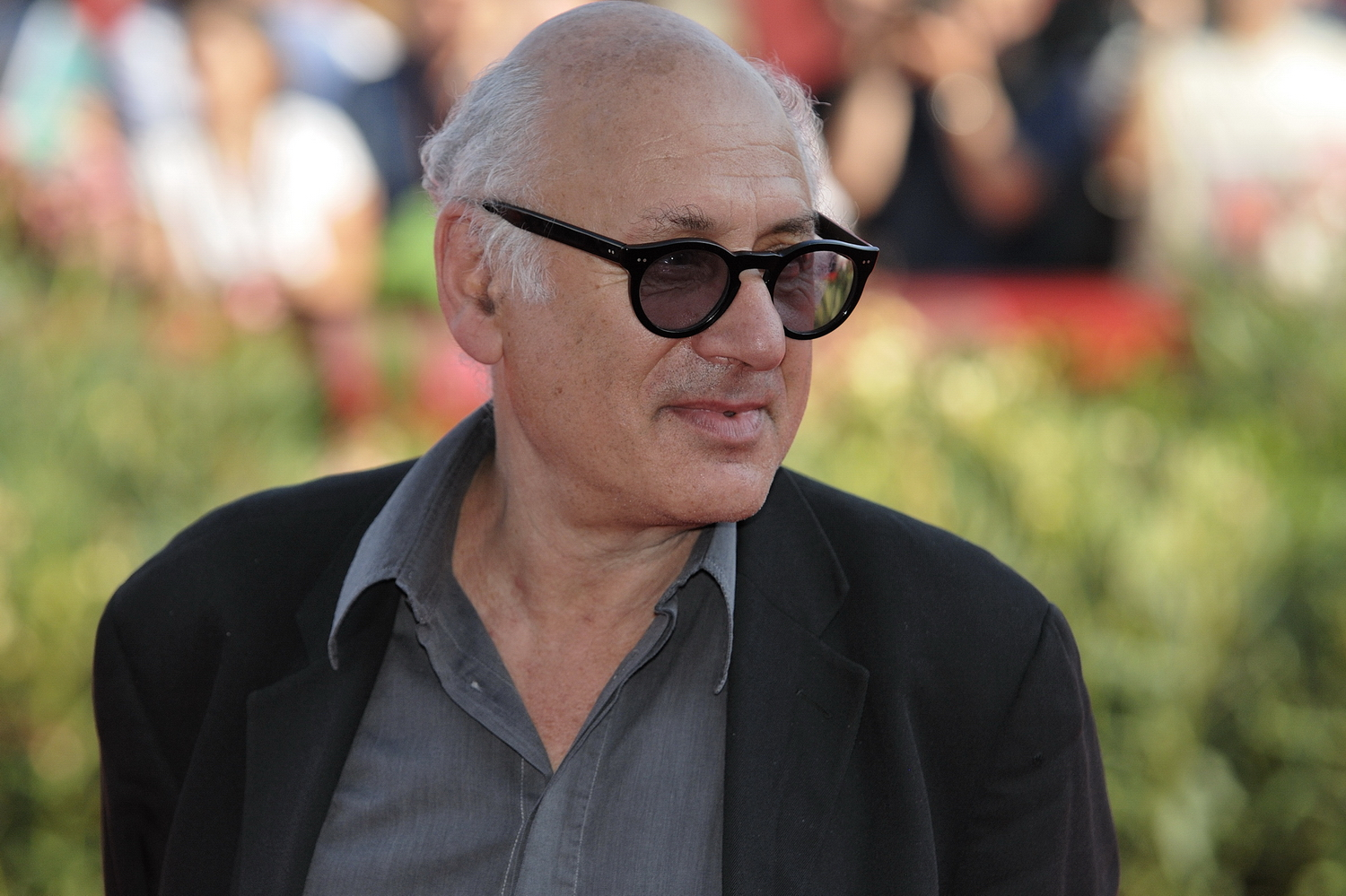
Golden Globe-winning composer Michael Nyman (BMus, 1971)

- Filiz Ali – pianist and musicologist
- Peter Asher – musician and record producer
- Sir Harrison Birtwistle – composer
- Fiona Brice – violinist
- Ming Bridges – singer
- David Bruce – composer
- Steven Burke – video game music composer and sound designer
- Francesco Cilluffo – conductor and composer
- Suzannah Clark – Professor of Music at Harvard University
- DJ Cuppy – Forbes-listed, award-winning musician and DJ
- Georgia Davies – bassist for The Last Dinner Party
- John Deacon – bassist for the rock band Queen
- Suzi Digby – conductor and musician
- Anne Dudley – Oscar-winning composer
- John Evan – keyboardist for Jethro Tull
- David Fallows – musicologist
- Harold Fraser-Simson – composer
- Dai Fujikura – composer
- Sir John Eliot Gardiner – conductor
- JB Gill – singer with British boyband JLS, now a farmer and broadcaster
- Raja Kashif – singer
- Daniel Leech-Wilkinson – musicologist
- Levina – singer
- Simon Lole – musician
- Andy Mackay – saxophonist for Roxy Music
- Alice Martineau – singer and songwriter
- Davitt Moroney – musicologist, harpsichordist and organist
- John Moran – musician and musicologist
- Abigail Morris – lead singer of The Last Dinner Party
- Mixmaster Morris – DJ
- Chris Newman – composer
- Michael Nyman – composer and musicologist
- Kele Okereke – Bloc Party vocalist and guitarist
- Alec Palao – musician, musicologist, writer and producer
- Roger Parker – musicologist
- John Porter – record producer
- Surendran Reddy – composer and pianist
- Jean-Baptiste Robin – composer and organist
- Adnan Sami – musician
- David Satian – composer
- Andrew Schultz – composer
- Shanon Shah – singer
- Gilli Smyth – musician who performed with Gong amongst others
- Jeremy Summerly – conductor
- Dobrinka Tabakova – composer
- Howard Talbot – composer and conductor
- Jeffrey Tate – conductor
- Jeremy Thurlow – composer
- Edward Top – composer
- Errollyn Wallen – composer
- Billy Werner – singer and songwriter
- Ian Willcock – composer
- Yiruma – composer and pianist
- Justin Hayward Young – lead singer of The Vaccines

=== Artists and photographers ===
- Pegaret Anthony – watercolourist
- Vanessa Bell – painter
- Albert Bruce-Joy – sculptor
- Joseph Crawhall III – artist
- Tristram Ellis – painter
- Peter Henry Emerson – photographer
- Cyril Wiseman Herbert – painter
- Ronald Moody – sculptor
- Richard Mosse – photographer
- Robyn O'Neil – artist
- Angela Verren – artist
- Moritz Waldemeyer – technical designer
- Sophia Wellbeloved – artist

== Business and economics ==
=== Company founders ===
- Rakesh Aggarwal – entrepreneur and founder of Escentual.com
- Allen Law – CEO and co-founder of Park Hotel Group
- Sanjeev Kanoria – chairman and co-founder of Advinia HealthCare
- Walter Bagot – co-founder of Woods Bagot
- Jamie Beaton – founder of Crimson Education
- Kartikeya Sharma – founder of ITV Network
- Walter Owen Bentley – founder of Bentley Motors
- Christian Candy – businessman (real estate) and founder of CPC Group
- William Foyle – founder of Foyles bookshop
- Jane Tranter – founder of Bad Wolf
- Klaus Heymann – entrepreneur and founder of Naxos Records
- Johnny Hon – founder of the Global Group
- Isabel dos Santos – Africa's richest woman and its first female billionaire, co-founder of Unitel
- Nathaniel Rothschild, 5th Baron Rothschild – founder of Atticus Capital
- Sir Alliott Verdon Roe – founder of Avro
- Naveen Selvadurai – co-founder of Foursquare
- Stephen Streater – founder of Eidos
- Priyanka Gill – co-founder of Good Glamm Group
- Harry Stebbings – venture capitalist and founder of 20VC
- Sir David Tang – businessman and founder of Shanghai Tang fashion chain
- Alvin Yeo – co-founder of WongPartnership

=== CEOs and business people ===
- Alex Beard – Chief Executive of the Royal Opera House
- Harriet Green – CEO of IBM Asia Pacific, former CEO of Thomas Cook Group
- John Blundell Maple – English business magnate and owner of Maple & Co.
- Victor Dzau – President and CEO of Duke University Medical Center
- Peter McCormick – Chairman of The Football Association (FA)
- Chris Cleverly – CEO of Made in Africa Foundation
- Kevon Glickman – CEO of RuffNation Records
- Nazrin Hassan – CEO of Cradle Fund
- Moazzam Ilyas – Chairman of Port Qasim Authority
- Edward G. Jefferson – CEO and Chairman of DuPont corporation
- Sara Rashid – President of Kurdistan Save the Children
- Katherine Elizabeth Fleming – CEO of J. Paul Getty Trust
- William Tritton – Chairman of William Foster & Co.
- Calouste Gulbenkian – Oil magnate and philanthropist
- Eurfyl ap Gwilym – Deputy Chairman of the Principality Building Society and Plaid Cymru politician
- Omar Ishrak – Chairman and CEO of Medtronic
- Richard G.R. Evans – Philanthropist and owner of Truro City F.C.
- Yvonne Lui – Hong Kong businesswoman and philanthropist
- Sir Deryck Maughan – CEO of Salomon Brothers
- Steve Mogford – CEO of United Utilities
- Harsha Abeywickrama – Chairman of Bank of Ceylon
- Eric Nicoli – CEO of EMI
- Toyin Ajayi – CEO of Cityblock Health
- Sir Ronald Norman – Chairman of Teesside Development Corporation
- Nneka Onyeali-Ikpe – CEO of Fidelity Bank Nigeria
- Eva Kwok – CEO of Amara International Investment Corporation, former CEO of Saskatchewan Polytechnic
- Mohammad Musa – Chairman of Mongla Port Authority
- Sir Edward Packard – Chairman of Fisons
- Tim Pryce – CEO of Terra Firma Capital Partners
- Gilbert Szlumper – General Manager of the Southern Railway (UK)
- Rory Tapner – CEO of Coutts
- Ruth McKernan – CEO of Innovate UK
- Richard Goatley – CEO of Middlesex County Cricket Club
- Sir William Tritton – inventor of the tank and Chairman & Managing Director of Fosters of Lincoln
- Lawrence Urquhart – Chairman of BAA
- Marcus Weldon – President of Bell Labs
- Mallory Evan Wijesinghe – Chairman of Ceylon Hotels Corporation; chairman of the Colombo Stock Exchange
- Douglas Carswell – CEO of Mississippi Center for Public Policy
- Dev Pragad – CEO of Newsweek
- Sania Nishtar – CEO of GAVI
- Lucy Chappell – CEO of National Institute for Health and Care Research
- Heidi Baker – CEO of Iris Global
- Wendy Piatt – CEO of Gresham College
- Kirsten Bodley – CEO of Institute of Asset Management

== Sport ==
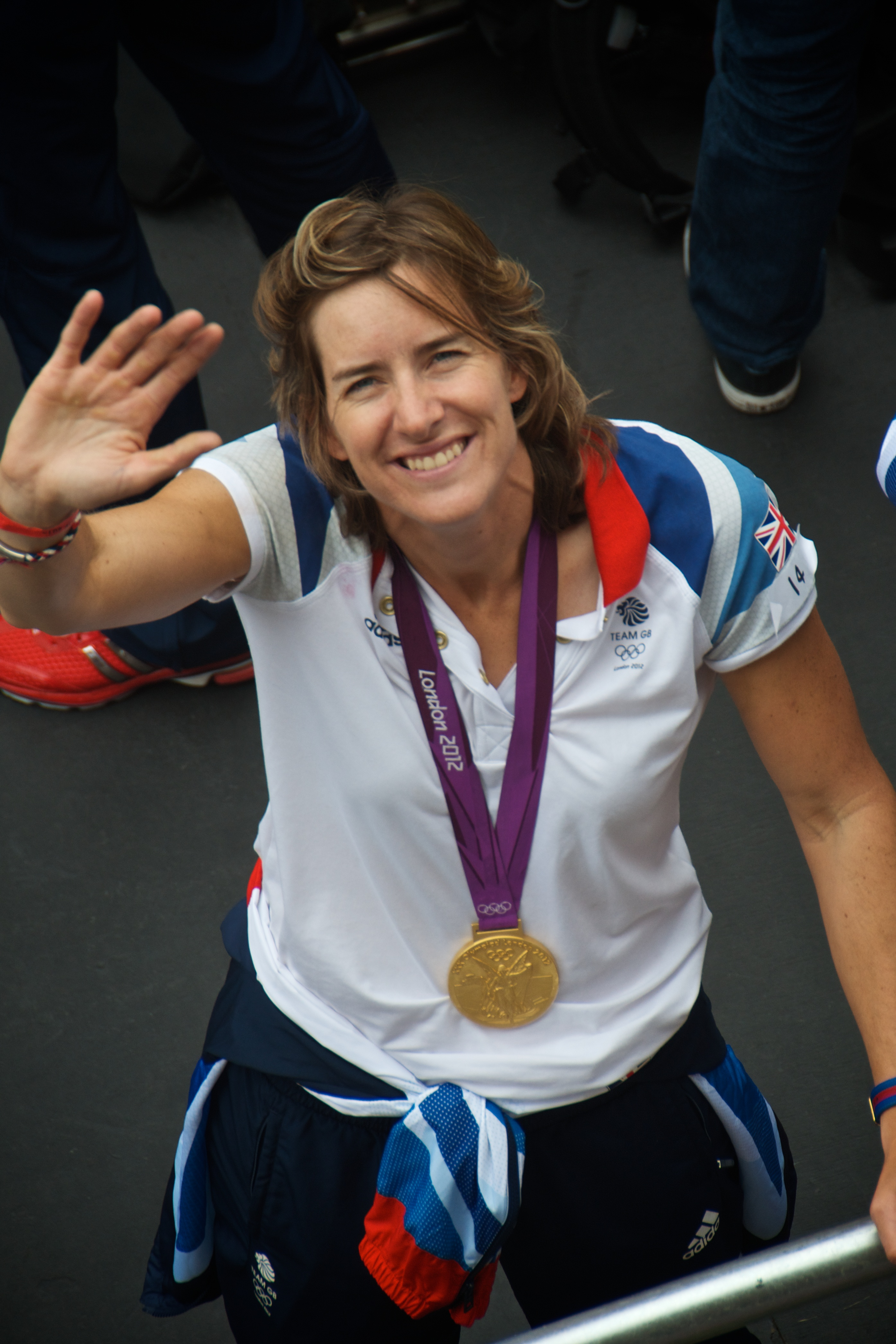
Four-time Olympic medal winner Dame Katherine Grainger (PhD, 2013)

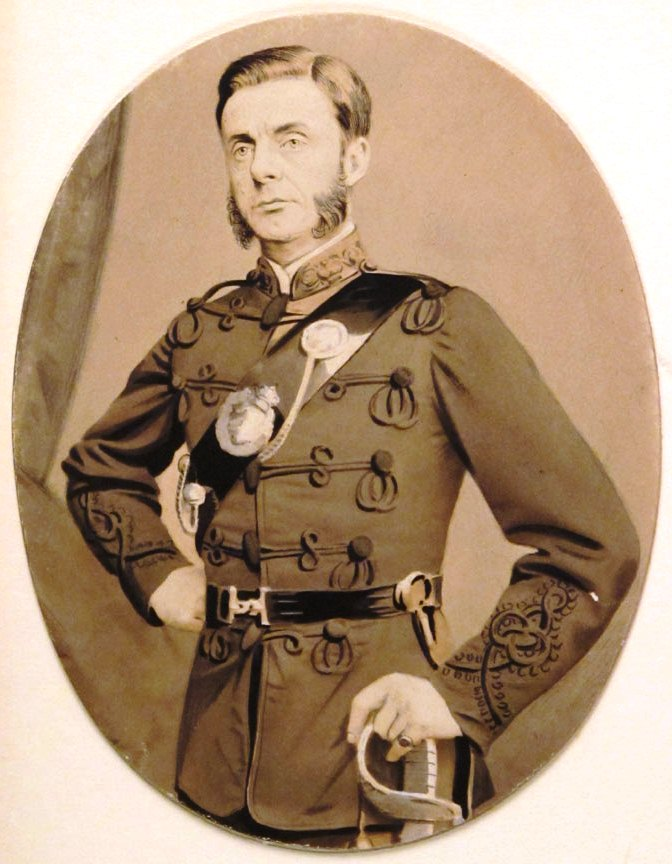
Harry Gem, inventor of the lawn tennis

- Michelle Agyemang – England footballer
- Jo Ankier – athlete
- Dina Asher-Smith – Olympic medal-winning sprinter
- Paul Bennett – Olympic gold medal-winning rower
- Barry Davies – sports commentator
- Tom Edgar – GT4 British racing driver
- Ayoola Erinle – England rugby player
- Harry Gem – inventor of lawn tennis
- Dame Katherine Grainger – Olympic gold medal-winning rower
- Frances Houghton – Olympic gold medal-winning rower
- Thomas Hollingdale – Welsh international rugby player
- Adam Khan – racing driver
- Imani-Lara Lansiquot – Olympic medal-winning sprinter
- Corinna Lawrence – fencer
- Zoe Lee – Olympic medal-winning rower
- Jayne Ludlow – women's footballer
- Laviai Nielsen – sprinter
- Edward Pegge – Welsh international rugby player
- Leigh Richmond Roose – Welsh international footballer
- Chris Sheasby – England rugby player
- Basil Tuma – Maltese international footballer
- Annabel Vernon – Olympic medal-winning rower
- Kieran West – Olympic gold medal-winning rower
- John Jayne – Olympic judoka, Paris 2024

== Architects ==
- Guy Maxwell Aylwin – architect
- Walter Bagot – architect
- Edward Middleton Barry – architect
- Frederick Pepys Cockerell – architect
- Sir William Emerson – President of the Royal Institute of British Architects
- Sir Banister Fletcher – architect
- Alfred Giles – architect
- John Alfred Gotch – President of the Royal Institute of British Architects
- Richard Phené Spiers – architect
- John Whichcord Jr. – architect

== Engineers ==
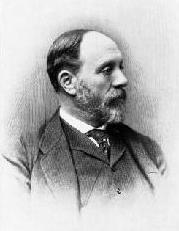
Famous civil engineer Sir John Wolfe-Barry, whose project was the building of the now iconic London Tower Bridge

- Mustafa Al-Bassam – software engineer and privacy activist
- Sir William Anderson – President of the Institution of Mechanical Engineers
- Henry Marc Brunel – civil engineer and son of Isambard Kingdom Brunel
- Henry Brogden – civil engineer
- William Clark – civil engineer and inventor
- Edward Cruttwell – civil engineer
- Henry Deane – engineer
- Sir John Dewrance – mechanical engineer and inventor
- Sir Douglas Fox – civil engineer
- Walter Katte – civil engineer
- Sir William Henry Preece – President of the Institution of Civil Engineers
- Kawal Rhode – Biomedical Engineer
- Bill Strang – aerospace engineer
- Julian Tolmé – civil engineer
- Thomas Walker – civil engineer
- Mark Whitby – civil engineer
- Sir John Wolfe-Barry – civil engineer

== Educators ==
- John William Adamson – first Master of the department for the Training of Teachers
- Sir William Atkinson – educator
- Edward Ernest Bowen – author of the Harrow School song
- Timothy Hands – Master of Magdalen College School
- Albert Mansbridge – educator
- Alan Smithers – educationalist

== Other ==
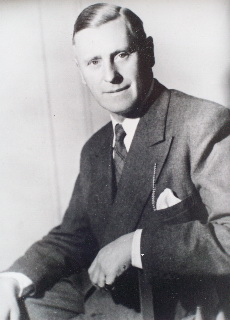
Sir Ivison Macadam, KCLSU President in 1922 and became the Founding President of the UK's National Union of Students

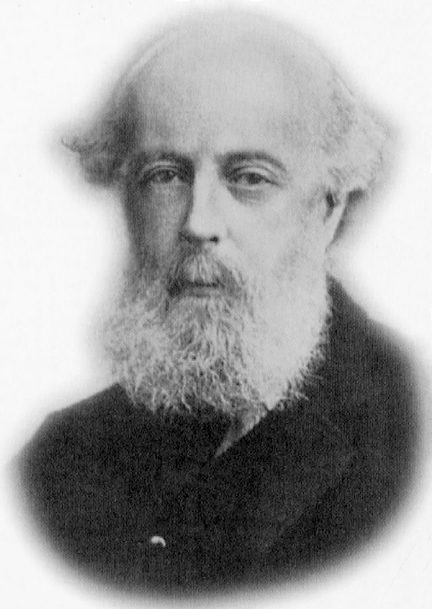
Thomas Armitage, founder of the Royal National Institute of the Blind (RNIB)

- Akeela Ahmed – anti-Islamophobia activist
- Asma al-Assad – married to the deposed Syrian President Bashar al-Assad and former First lady of Syria.
- Thomas Armitage – founder of the RNIB
- William Baker – stylist
- Nick Barratt – genealogist and Director of Senate House Library in the University of London
- Doyne Bell ― antiquary
- Sir William Coxen, 1st Baronet – Lord Mayor of London
- Harry Dagnall – philatelist
- Alex Dodoo – Ghanaian academic, pharmacist and Director General of Ghana Standards Authority
- Frederic Sutherland Ferguson – bibliographer
- Peter Fox – University of Cambridge librarian
- Harry Golombek – chess grandmaster
- Bob Halstead – scuba diver
- Sir Walter Howell – civil servant
- Leonard Hussey – explorer
- Dame Agnes Jekyll – philanthropist
- Sir Harry Johnston – explorer
- Helen Joseph – anti-apartheid activist
- Sia Koroma – First Lady of Sierra Leone
- Sir Ivison Macadam – first President of NUS and Director-General of Chatham House
- Sir Joseph Pilling – civil servant
- Hudson Stuck – explorer
- Sir Francis Wyatt Truscott – Lord Mayor of London
- Elizabeth Wilmshurst – civil servant
