= Minister of Foreign Affairs (Jordan) =

Minister of Foreign Affairs of the Hashemite Kingdom of Jordan is a cabinet minister in charge of the Ministry of Foreign Affairs of Jordan, responsible for conducting foreign relations of the country.

== List of ministers ==
The following is a list of foreign ministers of Jordan since 1939:

=== Emirate of Transjordan (1921–1946) ===
- 1939–1944: Tawfik Abu al-Huda
- 1944–1945: Muhammad ash-Shuraiki
- 1945–1946: Tawfik Abu al-Huda

=== Hashemite Kingdom of Jordan (1946–present) ===
- 1946–1947: Muhammad ash-Shuraiki
- 1947: Samir al-Rifai
- 1947–1949: Fawzi al-Mulki
- 1949: Ruhi Abdul Hadi
- 1949–1950: Samir al-Rifai
- 1950: Muhammad ash-Shuraiki
- 1950: Ruhi Abdul Hadi
- 1950–1951: Samir al-Rifai
- 1951: Ahmad Toukan
- 1951: Anastas Hanania
- 1951–1952: Tawfik Abu al-Huda
- 1952–1953: Fawzi al-Mulki
- 1953–1954: Husayn al-Khalidi
- 1954: Jamal Toukan
- 1954: Tawfik Abu al-Huda
- 1954–1955: Walid Salah
- 1955: Sa`id al-Mufti
- 1955: Hazza` al-Majali
- 1955–1956: Samir al-Rifai
- 1956: Husayn al-Khalidi
- 1956: Samir al-Rifai
- 1956: Suleiman Nabulsi
- 1956: Fawzi al-Mulki
- 1956: Awni Abd al-Hadi
- 1956–1957: Sulayman al-Nabulsi
- 1957–1958: Samir al-Rifai
- 1958–1959: Khulusi al-Khayri
- 1959: Hazza` al-Majali
- 1959–1961: Musa Nasir
- 1961: Bahjat al-Talhouni
- 1961–1962: Rafi al-Husseini
- 1962–1963: Hazem Nuseibeh
- 1963: Amin Husseini (acting)
- 1963: Sharif Hussein ibn Nasir
- 1963–1964: Anton Atallah
- 1964: Amin Husseini (acting)
- 1964–1965: Kadri Toukan
- 1965–1966: Hazem Nuseibeh
- 1966: Akram Zuaiter
- 1966–1967: Abdullah Salah
- 1967: Ahmad Toukan
- 1967: Muhammad Adib al-Amiri
- 1967–1968: Bahjat al-Talhouni
- 1968–1969: Abdelmunim al-Rifai
- 1969: Ahmad Toukan
- 1969–1970: Abdelmunim al-Rifai
- 1970: Anton Atallah
- 1970: Muhammad Daoud
- 1970–1972: Abdullah Salah
- 1972–1973: Salah Abu Zaid
- 1973–1976: Zaid al-Rifai
- 1976–1979: Mudar Badran
- 1979–1980: Sharif Abdul Hamid Sharaf
- 1980–1984: Marwan al-Qasim
- 1984–1988: Taher al-Masri
- 1988–1991: Marwan al-Qasim
- 1991: Taher al-Masri
- 1991: Abdullah Ensour
- 1991–1993: Kamel Abu Jaber
- 1993–1995: Abdul Salam al-Majali
- 1995–1997: Abdul Karim al-Kabariti
- 1997–1998: Fayez Tarawneh
- 1998: Jawad Anani
- 1998–2002: Abdul Ilah Khatib
- 2002–2004: Marwan al-Muasher
- 2004–2005: Hani al-Mulki
- 2005: Farouq Qasrawi
- 2005–2007: Abdul Ilah Khatib
- 2007–2009: Salah Bashir
- 2009–2017: Nasser Judeh
- 2017–present: Ayman Safadi
