= List of prime ministers of Jordan =

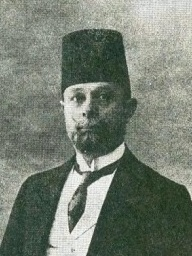
Rashid Talaa was the first prime minister of Jordan in 1921.

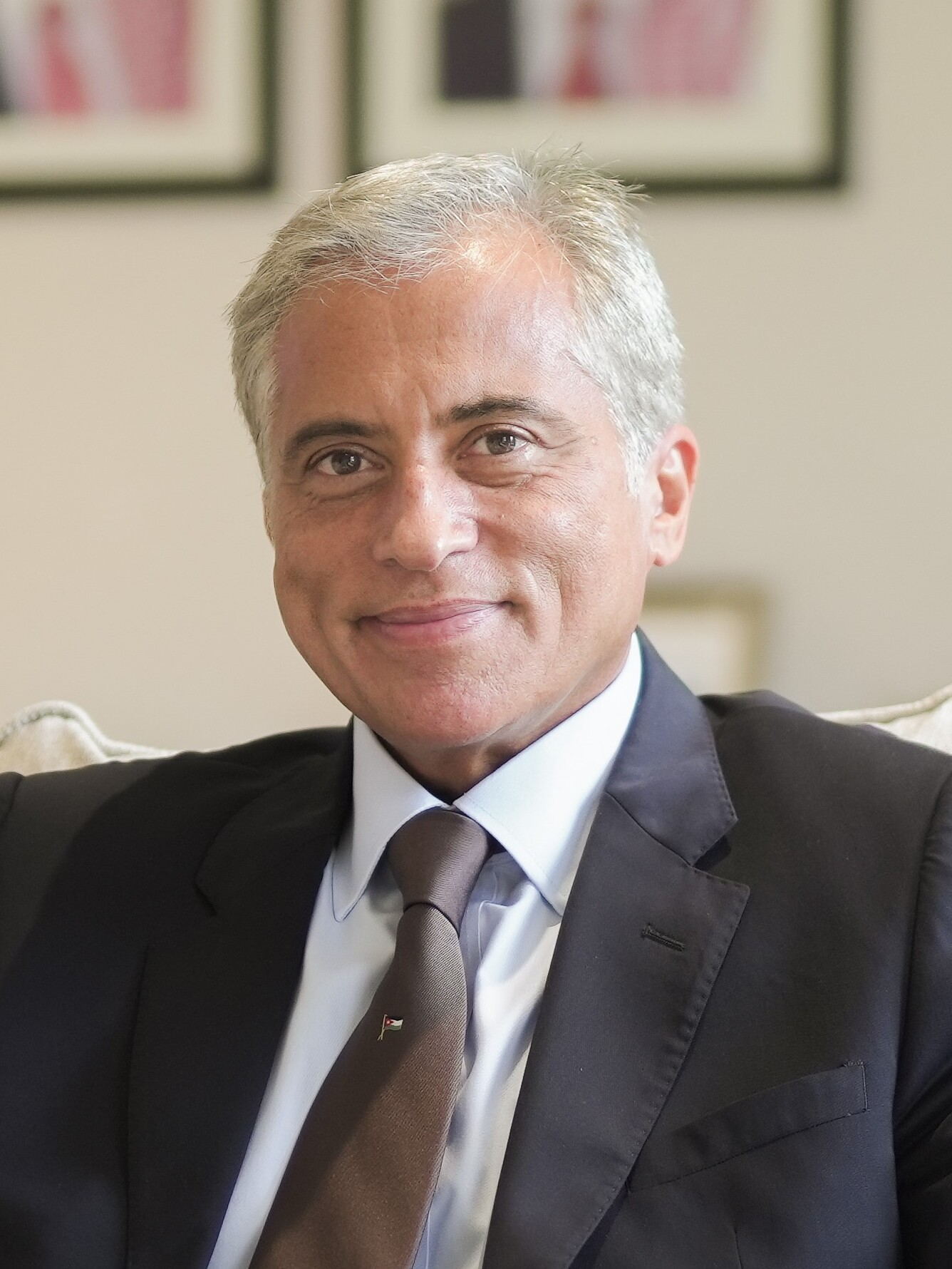
Jafar Hassan is the current prime minister.

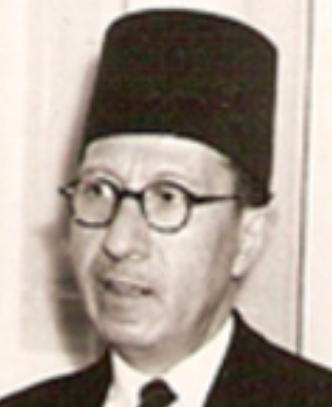
Tawfik Abu Al-Huda is the longest-serving prime minister.

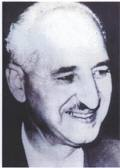
Suleiman Nabulsi headed the only parliamentary government in Jordan's history.

The prime minister of Jordan is the head of government of the Hashemite Kingdom of Jordan.

Since the establishment of the state as the Emirate of Transjordan in 1921, 44 people have held the position of prime minister, several of whom have served multiple non-consecutive terms. Tawfik Abu Al-Huda served for a total of 12 years and is considered the longest-serving prime minister.

Jordan's current constitution, which was promulgated in 1951, outlines that the prime minister is appointed by the king of Jordan, whose government must be approved through a vote of confidence by the elected lower chamber of Parliament, the House of Representatives. Jordan has had one parliamentary government in its history, the short-lived government led by Suleiman Nabulsi's National Socialist Party in 1956–57.

The incumbent prime minister is Jafar Hassan, who assumed office on 15 September 2024.

== List of officeholders ==
Political parties

Istiqlal Party (IP)
National Socialist Party (NSP)

Other affiliations

Military
Independent

Status

Denotes acting prime minister

No.	Portrait	Name (Birth–Death)	Term of office			Political party	Elected	Cabinet(s)	King (Reign)	Ref.
No.	Portrait	Name (Birth–Death)	Took office	Left office	Time in office	Political party	Elected	Cabinet(s)	King (Reign)	Ref.
• Emirate of Transjordan (1921–1946) •
1		Rashid Talaa (1877–1926)	11 April 1921	5 August 1921	116 days	IP	—	Talaa I	Abdullah (1921–1946)	
1		Rashid Talaa (1877–1926)	11 April 1921	5 August 1921	116 days	IP	—	Talaa II	Abdullah (1921–1946)	
2		Mazhar Raslan (1886–1948)	15 August 1921	10 March 1922	207 days	Independent	—	Raslan I	Abdullah (1921–1946)	
3		Ali al-Rikabi (1864–1943)	10 March 1922	1 February 1923	328 days	Military	—	al-Rikabi I	Abdullah (1921–1946)	
—		Mazhar Raslan (1886–1948) acting	1 February 1923	5 September 1923	216 days	Independent	—	Raslan II	Abdullah (1921–1946)	
4		Hasan Abu Al-Huda (1871–1936)	5 September 1923	3 March 1924	180 days	Independent	—	Al-Huda I	Abdullah (1921–1946)	
(3)		Ali al-Rikabi (1864–1943)	3 March 1924	26 June 1926	2 years, 115 days	Military	—	al-Rikabi II	Abdullah (1921–1946)	
(4)		Hasan Abu Al-Huda (1871–1936)	26 June 1926	22 February 1931	4 years, 241 days	Independent	—	Al-Huda II	Abdullah (1921–1946)	
(4)		Hasan Abu Al-Huda (1871–1936)	26 June 1926	22 February 1931	4 years, 241 days	Independent	1929	Al-Huda III	Abdullah (1921–1946)	
5		Abd Allah Siraj (1876–1949)	22 February 1931	18 October 1933	2 years, 238 days	Independent	1931	Siraj	Abdullah (1921–1946)	
6		Ibrahim Hashem (1878–1958)	18 October 1933	28 September 1938	4 years, 345 days	Independent	—	Hashem I	Abdullah (1921–1946)	
6		Ibrahim Hashem (1878–1958)	18 October 1933	28 September 1938	4 years, 345 days	Independent	1934	Hashem I	Abdullah (1921–1946)	
6		Ibrahim Hashem (1878–1958)	18 October 1933	28 September 1938	4 years, 345 days	Independent	1937	Hashem I	Abdullah (1921–1946)	
7		Tawfik Abu Al-Huda (1894–1956)	28 September 1938	15 October 1944	6 years, 17 days	Independent	—	Al-Huda I	Abdullah (1921–1946)	
7		Tawfik Abu Al-Huda (1894–1956)	28 September 1938	15 October 1944	6 years, 17 days	Independent	—	Al-Huda II	Abdullah (1921–1946)	
7		Tawfik Abu Al-Huda (1894–1956)	28 September 1938	15 October 1944	6 years, 17 days	Independent	—	Al-Huda III	Abdullah (1921–1946)	
7		Tawfik Abu Al-Huda (1894–1956)	28 September 1938	15 October 1944	6 years, 17 days	Independent	—	Al-Huda IV	Abdullah (1921–1946)	
7		Tawfik Abu Al-Huda (1894–1956)	28 September 1938	15 October 1944	6 years, 17 days	Independent	1942	Al-Huda IV	Abdullah (1921–1946)	
7		Tawfik Abu Al-Huda (1894–1956)	28 September 1938	15 October 1944	6 years, 17 days	Independent	—	Al-Huda V	Abdullah (1921–1946)	
8		Samir Al-Rifai (1901–1965)	15 October 1944	19 May 1945	216 days	Independent	—	Al-Rifai I	Abdullah (1921–1946)	
(6)		Ibrahim Hashem (1878–1958)	19 May 1945	25 May 1946	1 year, 6 days	Independent	—	Hashem II	Abdullah (1921–1946)	
• Hashemite Kingdom of Jordan (1946–present) •
(6)		Ibrahim Hashem (1878–1958)	25 May 1946	4 February 1947	255 days	Independent	—	Hashem II	Abdullah I (1946–1951)	
(8)		Samir Al-Rifai (1901–1965)	4 February 1947	28 December 1947	327 days	Independent	1947	Al-Rifai II	Abdullah I (1946–1951)	
(7)		Tawfik Abu Al-Huda (1894–1956)	28 December 1947	12 April 1950	2 years, 105 days	Independent	—	Al-Huda VI	Abdullah I (1946–1951)	
(7)		Tawfik Abu Al-Huda (1894–1956)	28 December 1947	12 April 1950	2 years, 105 days	Independent	—	Al-Huda VII	Abdullah I (1946–1951)	
9		Sa'id Mufti (1898–1989)	12 April 1950	4 December 1950	236 days	Independent	1950	Mufti I	Abdullah I (1946–1951)	
9		Sa'id Mufti (1898–1989)	12 April 1950	4 December 1950	236 days	Independent	—	Mufti II	Abdullah I (1946–1951)	
(8)		Samir Al-Rifai (1901–1965)	4 December 1950	25 July 1951	233 days	Independent	—	Al-Rifai III	Abdullah I (1946–1951)	
(7)		Tawfik Abu Al-Huda (1894–1956)	25 July 1951	5 May 1953	1 year, 284 days	Independent	—	Al-Huda VIII	Talal (1951–1952)	
(7)		Tawfik Abu Al-Huda (1894–1956)	25 July 1951	5 May 1953	1 year, 284 days	Independent	1951	Al-Huda IX	Talal (1951–1952)	
(7)		Tawfik Abu Al-Huda (1894–1956)	25 July 1951	5 May 1953	1 year, 284 days	Independent	—	Al-Huda X	Talal (1951–1952)	
10		Fawzi Mulki (1910–1962)	5 May 1953	4 May 1954	364 days	Independent	—	Mulki	Hussein (1952–1999)	
(7)		Tawfik Abu Al-Huda (1894–1956)	4 May 1954	30 May 1955	1 year, 26 days	Independent	1954	Al-Huda XI	Hussein (1952–1999)	
(7)		Tawfik Abu Al-Huda (1894–1956)	4 May 1954	30 May 1955	1 year, 26 days	Independent	—	Al-Huda XII	Hussein (1952–1999)	
(9)		Sa'id Mufti (1898–1989)	30 May 1955	15 December 1955	199 days	Independent	—	Mufti III	Hussein (1952–1999)	
11		Hazza' Majali (1917–1960)	15 December 1955	21 December 1955	6 days	Independent	—	Majali I	Hussein (1952–1999)	
—		Ibrahim Hashem (1878–1958) acting	21 December 1955	8 January 1956	18 days	Independent	—	Hashem III	Hussein (1952–1999)	
(8)		Samir Al-Rifai (1901–1965)	8 January 1956	22 May 1956	135 days	Independent	—	Al-Rifai IV	Hussein (1952–1999)	
(9)		Sa'id Mufti (1898–1989)	22 May 1956	1 July 1956	40 days	Independent	—	Mufti IV	Hussein (1952–1999)	
(6)		Ibrahim Hashem (1878–1958)	1 July 1956	29 October 1956	120 days	Independent	—	Hashem IV	Hussein (1952–1999)	
12		Suleiman Nabulsi (1908–1976)	29 October 1956	13 April 1957	166 days	NSP	1956	Nabulsi	Hussein (1952–1999)	
13		Hussein Khalidi (1895–1966)	15 April 1957	24 April 1957	9 days	Independent	—	Khalidi	Hussein (1952–1999)	
(6)		Ibrahim Hashem (1878–1958)	24 April 1957	18 May 1958	1 year, 24 days	Independent	—	Hashem V	Hussein (1952–1999)	
(8)		Samir Al-Rifai (1901–1965)	18 May 1958	6 May 1959	353 days	Independent	—	Al-Rifai V	Hussein (1952–1999)	
(11)		Hazza' Majali (1917–1960)	6 May 1959	29 August 1960 X	1 year, 85 days	Independent	—	Majali II	Hussein (1952–1999)	
14		Bahjat Talhouni (1913–1994)	29 August 1960	28 January 1962	1 year, 152 days	Independent	—	Talhouni I	Hussein (1952–1999)	
14		Bahjat Talhouni (1913–1994)	29 August 1960	28 January 1962	1 year, 152 days	Independent	1961	Talhouni II	Hussein (1952–1999)	
15		Wasfi Tal (1919–1971)	28 January 1962	27 March 1963	1 year, 58 days	Independent	—	Tal I	Hussein (1952–1999)	
15		Wasfi Tal (1919–1971)	28 January 1962	27 March 1963	1 year, 58 days	Independent	1962	Tal II	Hussein (1952–1999)	
(8)		Samir Al-Rifai (1901–1965)	27 March 1963	21 April 1963	25 days	Independent	—	Al-Rifai VI	Hussein (1952–1999)	
16		Hussein ibn Nasser (1902–1982)	21 April 1963	6 July 1964	1 year, 76 days	Independent	—	Nasser I	Hussein (1952–1999)	
16		Hussein ibn Nasser (1902–1982)	21 April 1963	6 July 1964	1 year, 76 days	Independent	1963	Nasser II	Hussein (1952–1999)	
(14)		Bahjat Talhouni (1913–1994)	6 July 1964	14 February 1965	223 days	Independent	—	Talhouni III	Hussein (1952–1999)	
(15)		Wasfi Tal (1919–1971)	14 February 1965	4 March 1967	2 years, 18 days	Independent	—	Tal III	Hussein (1952–1999)	
(15)		Wasfi Tal (1919–1971)	14 February 1965	4 March 1967	2 years, 18 days	Independent	—	Tal IV	Hussein (1952–1999)	
(16)		Hussein ibn Nasser (1902–1982)	4 March 1967	23 April 1967	50 days	Independent	—	Nasser III	Hussein (1952–1999)	
17		Saad Jumaa (1916–1979)	23 April 1967	7 October 1967	167 days	Independent	1967	Jumaa I	Hussein (1952–1999)	
17		Saad Jumaa (1916–1979)	23 April 1967	7 October 1967	167 days	Independent	—	Jumaa II	Hussein (1952–1999)	
(14)		Bahjat Talhouni (1913–1994)	7 October 1967	24 March 1969	1 year, 168 days	Independent	—	Talhouni IV	Hussein (1952–1999)	
18		Abdelmunim Rifai (1917–1985)	24 March 1969	13 August 1969	142 days	Independent	—	Rifai I	Hussein (1952–1999)	
(14)		Bahjat Talhouni (1913–1994)	13 August 1969	27 June 1970	318 days	Independent	—	Talhouni V	Hussein (1952–1999)	
(14)		Bahjat Talhouni (1913–1994)	13 August 1969	27 June 1970	318 days	Independent	—	Talhouni VI	Hussein (1952–1999)	
(18)		Abdelmunim Rifai (1917–1985)	27 June 1970	16 September 1970	81 days	Independent	—	Rifai II	Hussein (1952–1999)	
19		Mohammad Al-Abbasi (1914–1972)	16 September 1970	26 September 1970	10 days	Military	—	Al-Abbasi	Hussein (1952–1999)	
20		Ahmad Toukan (1903–1981)	26 September 1970	28 October 1970	32 days	Independent	—	Toukan	Hussein (1952–1999)	
(15)		Wasfi Tal (1919–1971)	28 October 1970	28 November 1971 X	1 year, 31 days	Independent	—	Tal V	Hussein (1952–1999)	
21		Ahmad Lozi (1925–2014)	29 November 1971	26 May 1973	1 year, 178 days	Independent	—	Lozi I	Hussein (1952–1999)	
21		Ahmad Lozi (1925–2014)	29 November 1971	26 May 1973	1 year, 178 days	Independent	—	Lozi II	Hussein (1952–1999)	
22		Zaid Rifai (1936–2024)	26 May 1973	13 July 1976	3 years, 48 days	Independent	—	Rifai I	Hussein (1952–1999)	
22		Zaid Rifai (1936–2024)	26 May 1973	13 July 1976	3 years, 48 days	Independent	—	Rifai II	Hussein (1952–1999)	
22		Zaid Rifai (1936–2024)	26 May 1973	13 July 1976	3 years, 48 days	Independent	—	Rifai III	Hussein (1952–1999)	
23		Mudar Badran (1934–2023)	13 July 1976	19 December 1979	3 years, 159 days	Independent	—	Badran I	Hussein (1952–1999)	
23		Mudar Badran (1934–2023)	13 July 1976	19 December 1979	3 years, 159 days	Independent	—	Badran I	Hussein (1952–1999)	
24		Abdelhamid Sharaf (1939–1980)	19 December 1979	3 July 1980 #	197 days	Independent	—	Sharaf	Hussein (1952–1999)	
25		Kassim Rimawi (1918–1982)	3 July 1980	28 August 1980	56 days	Independent	—	Rimawi	Hussein (1952–1999)	
(23)		Mudar Badran (1934–2023)	28 August 1980	10 January 1984	3 years, 135 days	Independent	—	Badran III	Hussein (1952–1999)	
26		Ahmad Obeidat (1938–2026)	10 January 1984	4 April 1985	1 year, 84 days	Independent	—	Obeidat	Hussein (1952–1999)	
(22)		Zaid Rifai (1936–2024)	4 April 1985	27 April 1989	4 years, 23 days	Independent	—	Rifai IV	Hussein (1952–1999)	
27		Zaid ibn Shaker (1934–2002)	27 April 1989	4 December 1989	221 days	Independent	1989	Shaker I	Hussein (1952–1999)	
(23)		Mudar Badran (1934–2023)	4 December 1989	19 June 1991	1 year, 197 days	Independent	—	Badran IV	Hussein (1952–1999)	
28		Taher Masri (born 1942)	19 June 1991	21 November 1991	155 days	Independent	—	Masri	Hussein (1952–1999)	
(27)		Zaid ibn Shaker (1934–2002)	21 November 1991	29 May 1993	1 year, 189 days	Independent	—	Shaker II	Hussein (1952–1999)	
29		Abdelsalam Majali (1925–2023)	29 May 1993	7 January 1995	1 year, 223 days	Independent	1993	Majali I	Hussein (1952–1999)	
(27)		Zaid ibn Shaker (1934–2002)	7 January 1995	4 February 1996	1 year, 28 days	Independent	—	Shaker III	Hussein (1952–1999)	
30		Abdul Karim Kabariti (born 1949)	4 February 1996	9 March 1997	1 year, 33 days	Independent	—	Kabariti	Hussein (1952–1999)	
(29)		Abdelsalam Majali (1925–2023)	9 March 1997	20 August 1998	1 year, 164 days	Independent	—	Majali II	Hussein (1952–1999)	
(29)		Abdelsalam Majali (1925–2023)	9 March 1997	20 August 1998	1 year, 164 days	Independent	1997	Majali II	Hussein (1952–1999)	
31		Fayez Tarawneh (1949–2021)	20 August 1998	4 March 1999	196 days	Independent	—	Tarawneh I	Hussein (1952–1999)	
32		Abdelraouf Rawabdeh (born 1939)	4 March 1999	19 June 2000	1 year, 107 days	Independent	—	Rawabdeh	Abdullah II (1999–present)	
33		Ali Abu Al-Ragheb (1946–2026)	19 June 2000	25 October 2003	3 years, 128 days	Independent	—	Al-Ragheb I	Abdullah II (1999–present)	
33		Ali Abu Al-Ragheb (1946–2026)	19 June 2000	25 October 2003	3 years, 128 days	Independent	—	Al-Ragheb II	Abdullah II (1999–present)	
33		Ali Abu Al-Ragheb (1946–2026)	19 June 2000	25 October 2003	3 years, 128 days	Independent	—	Al-Ragheb III	Abdullah II (1999–present)	
34		Faisal Al-Fayez (born 1952)	25 October 2003	6 April 2005	1 year, 163 days	Independent	2003	Al-Fayez	Abdullah II (1999–present)	
35		Adnan Badran (born 1935)	6 April 2005	27 November 2005	235 days	Independent	—	A. Badran	Abdullah II (1999–present)	
36		Marouf al-Bakhit (1947–2023)	27 November 2005	25 November 2007	1 year, 363 days	Independent	—	al-Bakhit I	Abdullah II (1999–present)	
37		Nader Al-Dahabi (born 1946)	25 November 2007	14 December 2009	2 years, 19 days	Independent	2007	Al-Dahabi	Abdullah II (1999–present)	
38		Samir Rifai (born 1966)	14 December 2009	9 February 2011	1 year, 57 days	Independent	—	Rifai I	Abdullah II (1999–present)	
38		Samir Rifai (born 1966)	14 December 2009	9 February 2011	1 year, 57 days	Independent	2010	Rifai II	Abdullah II (1999–present)	
(36)		Marouf al-Bakhit (1947–2023)	9 February 2011	24 October 2011	257 days	Independent	—	al-Bakhit II	Abdullah II (1999–present)	
39		Awn Al-Khasawneh (born 1950)	24 October 2011	2 May 2012	191 days	Independent	—	Al-Khasawneh	Abdullah II (1999–present)	
(31)		Fayez Tarawneh (1949–2021)	2 May 2012	11 October 2012	162 days	Independent	—	Tarawneh II	Abdullah II (1999–present)	
40		Abdullah Ensour (born 1939)	11 October 2012	1 June 2016	3 years, 234 days	Independent	—	Ensour I	Abdullah II (1999–present)	
40		Abdullah Ensour (born 1939)	11 October 2012	1 June 2016	3 years, 234 days	Independent	2013	Ensour II	Abdullah II (1999–present)	
41		Hani Mulki (born 1951)	1 June 2016	14 June 2018	2 years, 13 days	Independent	—	Mulki I	Abdullah II (1999–present)	
41		Hani Mulki (born 1951)	1 June 2016	14 June 2018	2 years, 13 days	Independent	2016	Mulki II	Abdullah II (1999–present)	
42		Omar Razzaz (born 1961)	14 June 2018	12 October 2020	2 years, 120 days	Independent	—	Razzaz	Abdullah II (1999–present)	
43		Bisher Khasawneh (born 1969)	12 October 2020	15 September 2024	3 years, 339 days	Independent	2020	Khasawneh	Abdullah II (1999–present)	
44		Jafar Hassan (born 1968)	15 September 2024	Incumbent	1 year, 352 days	Independent	2024	Hassan	Abdullah II (1999–present)	

== See also ==
- List of kings of Jordan
