= Fawzi al-Mulki's cabinet =

- 1953–1954
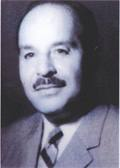
- Date formed: 2 May 1953

People and organisations
- Monarch: King Hussein
- Prime Minister: Fawzi al-Mulki
- Prime Minister's history: 1953–1954
- Deputy Prime Minister: Sa'id Mufti

History
- Predecessor: Tawfik Abu Al-Huda
- Successor: Tawfik Abu Al-Huda

Fawzi Al-Mulki's cabinet was the first cabinet after Hussein of Jordan became a king on 2 May 1953. It's the 28th cabinate after the establishment of the Emirate of Transjordan in 1921. This cabinet worked for only one year starting 5 May 1953 until the resignation on 4 May 1954.

== Cabinet members ==
- Fawzi Al-Mulki: Prime Minister and Defense Minister
- Sa`id al-Mufti: Deputy prime minister and minister of state
- Suliman Sukkar: minister of finance.
- Ahmad Toukan: Education minister.
- Anstas Hanania: Trade minister
- Anwar Khatib: Economic, Development and Constructions
- Hikmat Al Masri: Agriculture minister.
- Husayn al-Khalidi: Foreign Affairs minister
- Shafiq Irshaidat: Justice and Transportation.
- Mustafa Khalifa: Health and Social affairs
- Bahjat Talhouni: Interior Affairs minister.

== Resource ==
- الحكومات الأردنية في عهد جلالة الملك الحسين بن طلال (1953-1967)، تأليف الدكتور عمر صالح العمري والدكتور زيد محمد خضر. الجزء الأول، 2011م.
