= 1942 Transjordanian general election =

General elections were held in Transjordan on 20 October 1942.

== Electoral system ==
The 1928 basic law provided for a unicameral Legislative Council. The 16 elected members were joined by the six-member cabinet, which included the Prime Minister. The term length was set at three years.

== Results ==
The sixteen elected members were:

- Majed al-Adwan
- Yosef al-Akshah
- Isa al-Awad
- Salim al-Hindawi
- Mahmud al-Kraishan
- Refefan al-Majali
- Fawzi al-Mufti
- Alhajj Soud al-Nablsi
- Abdul-Qader al-Tall
- Hessen al-Tarawneh
- Salameh al-Twall
- Ghdoub al-Zaben
- Hamad Bin Jazi
- Mosa al-Awad Hejazi
- Hessen Khawajah
- Sabri Tabba'

=== By-election ===
Following the death of Refefan Al-Majali on 24 January 1945, M'arek Al-Majali was elected as a replacement on 1 September. Majed al-Adwan died 2 June 1946, with Noffan al-So'ud elected to replace him on 16 September.

== Aftermath ==
Five governments were formed during the term of the Legislative Council, which was extended by two years to last until 1947.

- First government (in office until 9 May 1943)
  - Led by Ibrahim Hashem and included Ahmad Olwi al-Saqaf, Nuqoula Ghanama, Abdul-Muhdi Al-Shamayleh, Samir al-Rifai and Abdullah Kolayb al-Shraideh.
- Second government (9 May 1943 to 14 October 1944)
  - Led by Tawfik Abu al-Huda and included Shukri Sha'sha'ah, Ahmad Olwi al-Saqaf, Samir al-Rifai, Abdul-Rahman Rshaidat and Hanna al-Qsous.
- Third government (15 October 1944 to 18 May 1945)
  - Led by Samir al-Rifai and included Sa`id al-Mufti, Hashem Khair, Nuqoula Ghanama, Fahmi Hashem and Msalam al-Attar.
- Fourth government (19 May 1945 to 1 February 1947)
  - Led by Ibrahim Hashem and included Tawfik Abu al-Huda, Sa`id al-Mufti, Nuqoula Ghanama, Fahmi Hashem and Msalam al-Attar.
- Fifth government (4 February 1947 to 27 December 1947)
  - Led by Samir al-Rifai and included Omar al-Attar, Muhammad al-Amin al-Shanqiti, Abbas Mirza, Suleyman al-Nabelsi and Bsharah Ghaseeb.
