= 1937 Transjordanian general election =

General elections were held in Transjordan on 16 October 1937.

== Electoral system ==
The 1928 basic law provided for a unicameral Legislative Council. The 16 elected members were joined by the six-member cabinet, which included the Prime Minister. The term length was set at three years.

== Results ==
The sixteen elected members were:

- Majed al-Adwan
- Mahmud al-Awad
- Mahmud al-Fniash
- Salti al-Ibrahim
- Hadeethah al-Khraishah
- Abdallah al-Kulayb
- Mahmud al-Kreshan
- Refefan al-Majali
- Alhajj Soud al-Nablsi
- Salih al-Oran
- Ibrahim al-Sharayhah
- Khaleel al-Sokar
- Hamad Bin Jazi
- Shawkat Hameed
- Hessen Khawajah
- Sabri Tabba'

=== By-election ===
By-elections were required after two members of the council were appointed governors in 1941. After being appointed as a Governor on 2 August, Abdallah al-Kulayb left the council and in the subsequent by-election, Muhammad Al-Sa'd was elected. On 6 September Shawkat Hameed was also appointed as a governor, with Omar Hekmat elected to replace him.

== Aftermath ==
Five governments were formed during the term of the Legislative Council, which was extended by two years to last until 1942.

- First government - in office until 28 September 1938
  - Led by Ibrahim Hashem and included Odeh Al-Qsous, Sa`id al-Mufti, Shukri Sha'sha'h, Hashem Khiar and Qasem Al-Hindawi.
- Second government (28 September 1938 to 6 August 1939)
  - Led by Tawfik Abu al-Huda and included Hashem Khiar, Ahmad Olwi al-Saqaf, Abdullah al-Hmoud, Khalaf al-Tall and Nuqoula Ghanama.
- Third government (6 August 1939 to 24 September 1940)
  - Led by al-Huda and included Ahmad Olwi al-Saqaf, Nuqoula Ghanama, Rasheeed al-Madfa'i, Abdullah al-Nemer and Ali al-Kayed.
- Fourth government (25 September 1940 to 27 July 1941)
  - Led by al-Huda and included Omar Hekmat, Shukri Sha'sha'ah, Ahmad Olwi al-Saqaf, Nuqoula Ghanama and Ali al-Kayed.
- Fifth government (29 July 1941 to 18 May 1943)
  - Led by al-Huda and included Ahmad Olwi al-Saqaf, Nuqoula Ghanama, Abdul-Muhdi al-Shamayleh, Samir al-Rifai and Abdullah Kolayb al-Shraideh.
