= Hussein Khalidi =

Palestinian-Jordanian politician (1895–1962)

Husayn al-Khalidi
- حسين فخري الخالدي
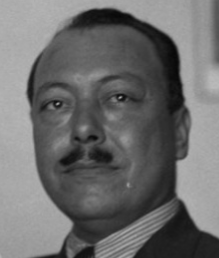

13th Prime Minister of Jordan
- In office 15 April 1957 – 24 April 1957
- Monarch: King Hussein
- Preceded by: Suleiman al-Nabulsi
- Succeeded by: Ibrahim Hashem

Minister of Foreign Affairs of Jordan
- In office 8 January 1956 – 22 May 1956
- Monarch: King Hussein
- Prime Minister: Samir Al-Rifai
- Preceded by: Samir Al-Rifai
- Succeeded by: Samir Al-Rifai
- In office 5 May 1953 – 2 May 1954
- Monarch: King Hussein
- Prime Minister: Fawzi Mulki
- Preceded by: Fawzi Mulki
- Succeeded by: Jamal Toukan

Minister of Health of Palestine
- In office 22 September 1948 – 1951
- President: Amin al-Husseini
- Prime Minister: Ahmed Hilmi Pasha
- Preceded by: Office established
- Succeeded by: Riyad al-Zanoun (1994)

Mayor of Jerusalem
- In office January 1935 – 1937
- Preceded by: Raghib al-Nashashibi
- Succeeded by: Daniel Auster

Personal details
- Born: 17 January 1895 Jerusalem, Ottoman Empire
- Died: 6 February 1962 (aged 67) Amman, Jordan
- Party: Reform Party
- Spouse: Wahida al-Khalidi
- Relations: Ismail al-Khalidi (brother)
- Education: American University of Beirut
- Profession: Politician, physician, soldier

Military service
- Allegiance: Ottoman Empire
- Branch/service: Ottoman Army
- Years of service: 1916–1918
- Battles/wars: World War I

Hussein Fakhri Khalidi (Arabic: حسين فخري الخالدي, Ḥusayn Fakhri al-Khalidī, 17 January 1895 – 6 February 1962) was a Palestinian politician and physician. He served as mayor of Jerusalem from 1935 to 1937, minister of health of Palestine in 1948, minister of foreign affairs of Jordan from 1953 to 1954 and again in 1956 and was the 13th Prime Minister of Jordan in 1957.

== Early life ==
Khalidi served as a doctor in the Ottoman Army during World War I, and was injured three times. He subsequently served for over a decade as a member of Jerusalem's Health Department and as an Inspector of Jerusalem's Water Department.

== Political career ==
In September 1934, Kalidi sought election as both as Mayor of Jerusalem and for Raghib al-Nashashibi's seat on the City Council. He won the latter, and was subsequently appointed to the former on 21 January 1935, days after an appeal of the election results by Nashashibi was rejected by the Jerusalem District Court. Daniel Auster and Yacoub Farradj became Deputy Mayors.

On 23 June 1935 Khalidi founded the Reform Party and was subsequently the party's representative to the Arab Higher Committee.

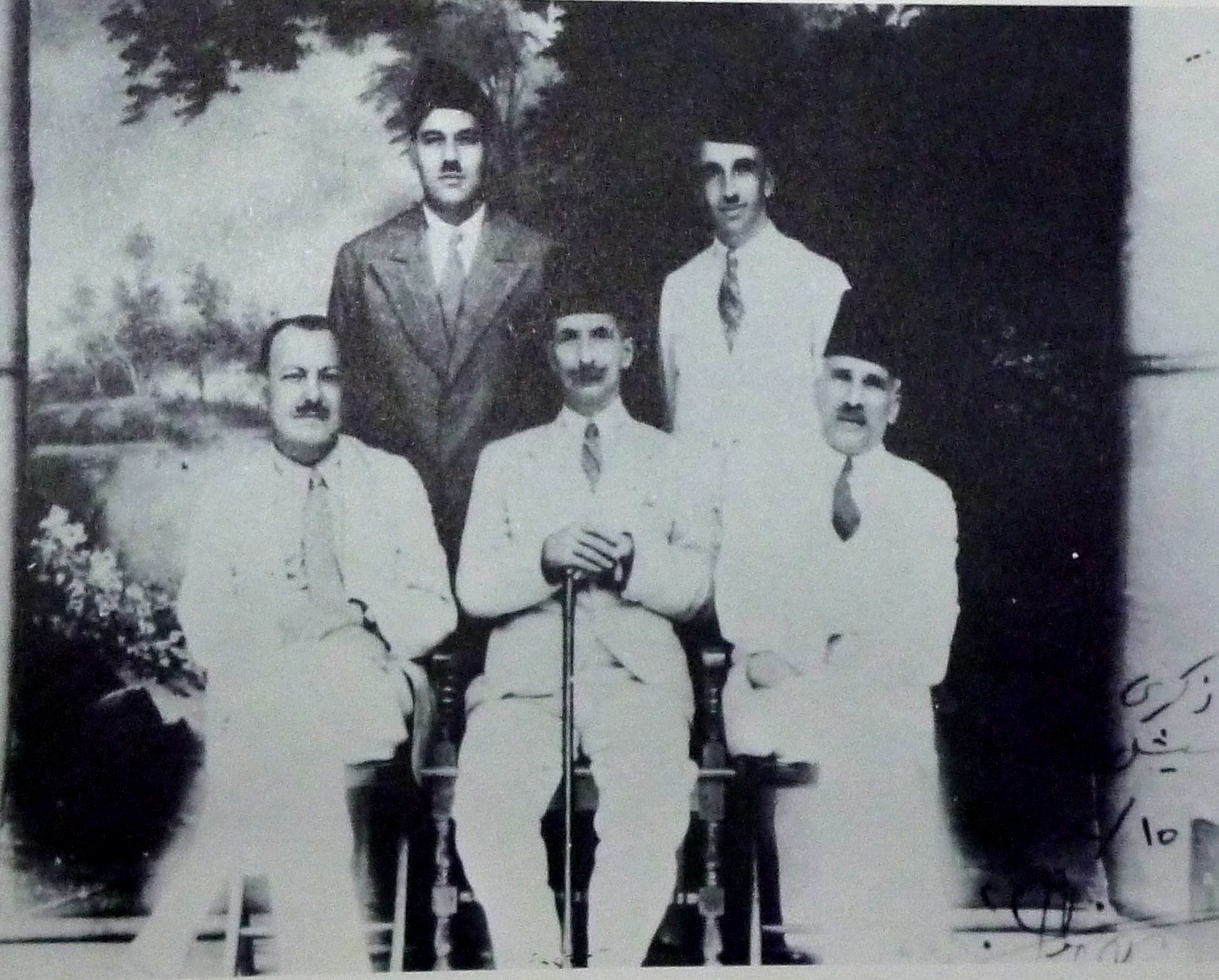
al-Khalidi, seated in front, together with the four other deportees in Seychelles, 1938.

On 1 October 1937, amid the 1936–1939 Arab revolt in Palestine, the British Mandate administration outlawed the AHC and several Arab political parties and arrested a number of Arab political leaders. The Reform Party was dissolved and Khalidi was one of the leaders arrested. He was removed as mayor of Jerusalem and deported to the Seychelles, together with four other Arab nationalist political leaders. He was released in December 1938 to enable him to take part in the London Conference in February 1939, and was among those rejecting the British Government's White Paper of 1939.

Khalidi returned to Mandatory Palestine in November 1942 and joined the reformed Arab Higher Committee in 1945, becoming its secretary in 1946. He was a member of the short-lived All-Palestine Government established under Egypt's patronage in Gaza in September 1948. He published a book of his memoirs in the same year, while exiled in Beirut. He prospered under Jordanian rule, he was custodian and supervisor of the Haram al-Sharif in 1951, became a cabinet minister (for Foreign Affairs) and briefly prime minister in 1957. In 1958, he wrote a book in English entitled Arab Exodus, though it has never been published.

Khalidi died on 6 February 1962. He was the brother of Ismail Khalidi and the uncle of Rashid Khalidi and Raja Khalidi.

== See also ==
- List of prime ministers of Jordan

Political offices
Preceded by Raghib al-Nashashibi	Mayor of Jerusalem; 1935–1937	Succeeded by Daniel Auster
New office	Minister of Health of Palestine; 1948–1951	Vacant Title next held by Riyad al-Zanoun
Preceded by Fawzi Mulki	Minister of Foreign Affairs of Jordan; 1953–1954	Succeeded by Jamal Toukan
Preceded by Samir Al-Rifai	Minister of Foreign Affairs of Jordan; 1956	Succeeded by Samir Al-Rifai
Preceded by Sulayman al-Nabulsi	Prime Minister of Jordan; 1957	Succeeded by Ibrahim Hashem
