= 1931 Transjordanian general election =

Early general elections were held in Transjordan on 10 June 1931, following the dissolution of the Legislative Council elected in 1929 after it failed to pass the budget annex.

== Electoral system ==
The 1928 basic law provided for a unicameral Legislative Council. The 16 elected members were joined by the six-member cabinet, which included the Prime Minister. The term length was set at three years.

== Results ==
The sixteen elected members were:

- Saeed Abu Jaber
- Adel al-Admeh
- Majed al-Adwan
- Najee al-Azzam
- Qasem al-Hendawi
- Salti al-Ibrahim
- Hadetheh Al-Khreshah
- Refefan al-Majali
- Sa`id al-Mufti
- Saleh al-Oran
- Mohammad al-Sa'd
- Hseen al-Tarawneh
- Metri al-Zreqat
- Hamad Bin Jazi
- Hashem Khiar
- Hseen Khawajah

== Aftermath ==
Abdallah Sarraj formed a new government, which also included Tawfik Abu al-Huda, Odeh al-Qsous, Omar Hekmat, Shokri Sha'sha'ah and Adeeb al-Kayed. On 18 October 1933 a new government was formed by Ibrahim Hashem, which included Odeh Al-Qsous, Sa`id al-Mufti, Shokri Sha'sha'ah, Hashem Khiar and Qasem Al-Hendawi. The Council became the first to serve a full term, and lasted until 10 June 1934.
