= 1929 Transjordanian general election =

- 2 April 1929

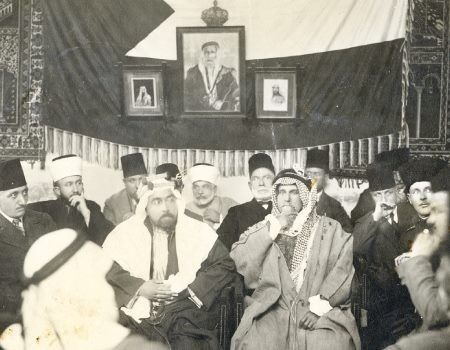
Elections hall on 2 April 1929

General elections were held in Transjordan on 2 April 1929, the first in the country's history.

== Background ==
Following the preparation of electoral laws and a draft constitution by the Jordanian authorities in 1923, the British government declared an intention to recognise the independence of the country and prepare a treaty. However, the treaty was not signed until 20 February 1928.

== Electoral system ==
The 1928 basic law provided for a unicameral Legislative Council. The 16 elected members were joined by the six-member cabinet, which included the Prime Minister. The term length was set at three years.

== Results ==
The sixteen elected members were:

- Najeeb al-Shraideh
- Abdallah al-Kulayb
- Oqla Mohammad al-Nsuir
- Najeeb Abu al-Sha'ar
- Sa`id al-Mufti
- Ala'a al-Dien Touqan
- Shams al-Dien Sami
- Saeed al-Saleepi
- Mohammad al-Ensi
- Najeeb al-Ibrahim
- Ata Allah a-Shemat
- Refefan al-Majali
- Odeh al-Qsous
- Saleh al-Oran
- Hamad Bin Jazi
- Methqal al-Fayez

After being appointed Director of Antiquities, Ala'a al-Dien Touqan resigned from the council. In a by-election held on 14 November 1929, Nadmi Abd Al-Hadi was elected to replace him.

== Aftermath ==
Hassan Khalid Abu al-huda remained Prime Minister, and joined the Council along with the ministers Reda Tawfiq, Hussam al-Dien Jaar Allah, Aref al-Aref, Abd al-Rahman Ghareeb and Alin Karkbried. On 17 October 1929 al-Huda formed a new government, which included Ibrahim Hashem, Tawfik Abu al-Huda, Ala'a al-Dien Touqan, Odeh al-Qsous and Sa`id al-Mufti.

The council was dissolved on 9 January 1931 after rejecting the budget annex. Early elections were held on 10 June.
