= Marwan Muasher =

Jordanian diplomat and politician

Marwan Jameel Essa al-Muasher Dababneh
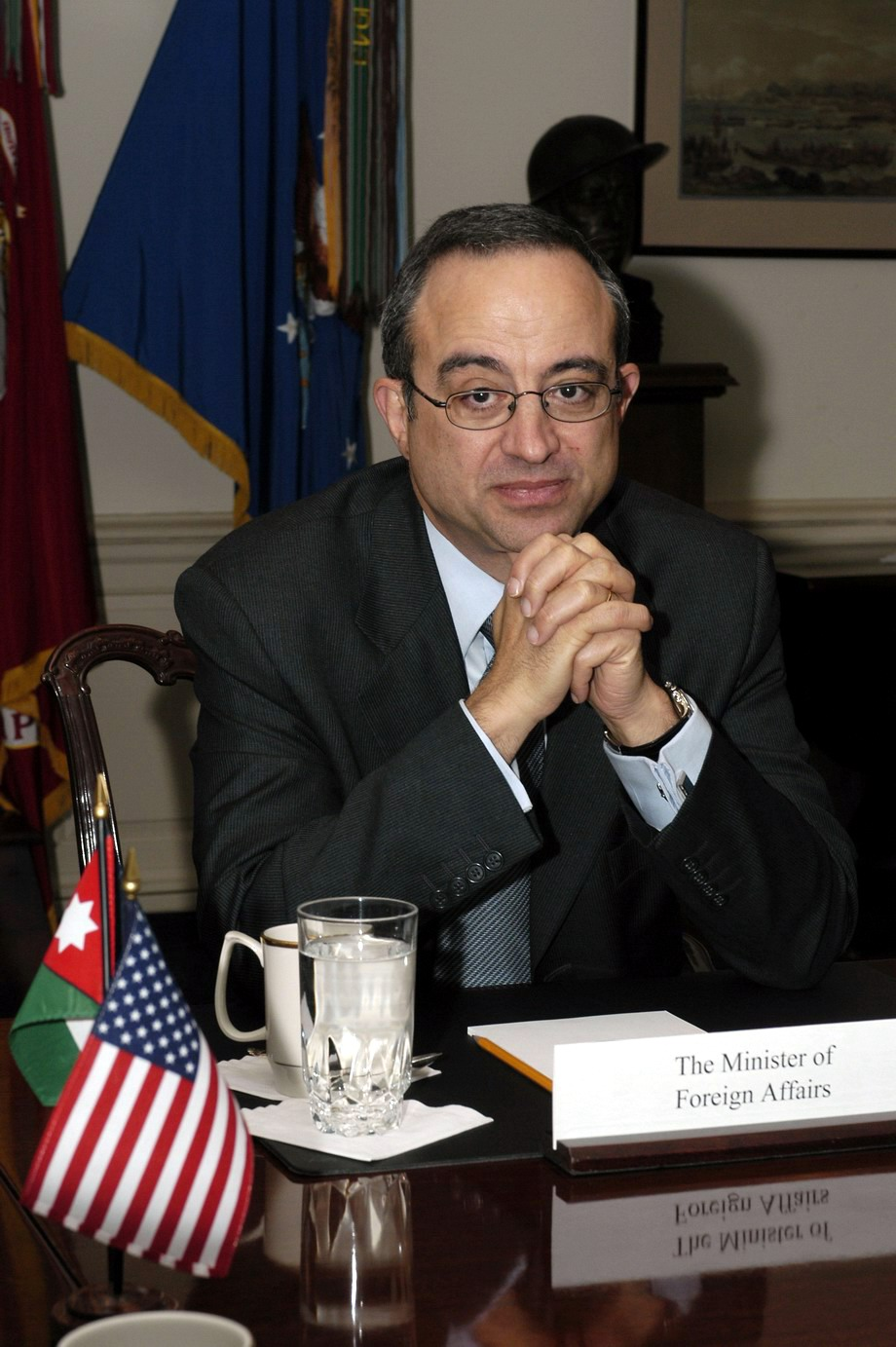

Deputy Prime Minister
- In office 3 July 2005 – 24 November 2005

Personal details
- Born: 1956 (age 69–70) Amman, Jordan

Marwan al-Muasher Dababneh (Arabic: مروان المعشر الدبابنه) (born 1956) is a former Jordanian diplomat and politician who was Jordan's foreign minister from 2002 to 2004 and its deputy prime minister during 2004 and 2005. He currently serves as vice president for studies at the Carnegie Endowment for International Peace, where he oversees research on the Middle East. He was Jordan's first ambassador to Israel and former ambassador to the United States.

== Education and early career ==
Muasher attended Purdue University in West Lafayette, Indiana, where he earned a Bachelor of Science degree in electrical engineering in 1977, a Master of Science degree in computer engineering in 1978, and a PhD, also in computer engineering, in 1981.

Muasher began his career working as a journalist for the Jordan Times, the only Jordanian newspaper in the English language. He then entered government service, working in communications in the Ministry of Planning, at the prime minister's office as press adviser, and as director of the Jordan Information Bureau in Washington, D.C.

== Career ==
=== Jordanian politics ===
In 1995, following the 1994 Israel–Jordan peace treaty, Muasher became Jordan's first ambassador to Israel. Then, in 1996, he became minister of information and the government spokesperson. From 1997 to 2002, he served in Washington, D.C., again as ambassador to the United States, and helped negotiate the Jordan–U.S. Free Trade Agreement, the first free-trade agreement the United States signed with an Arab country.

He returned to Jordan in January 2002 to serve as foreign minister, where he played a central role in developing the Arab Peace Initiative and the Middle East roadmap. He served until October 2004, when he gained the post of deputy prime minister in a cabinet reshuffle under former Prime Minister Adnan Badran that sought to continue reform and shrink the bureaucracy. He served as the deputy prime minister until November 2005. In 2005 he developed the National Agenda, a long-term political, economic and social reform plan for Jordan. The making up of the plan involved 450 Jordanian stakeholders and experts giving solutions and deadlines to implement them. The National Agenda was never actually realized because, according to Muasher, it was thwarted by a group of political elites and bureaucrats, eager to keep a rentier-based state system, rather than one based on merit. According to Sultan Sooud Al-Qassemi, al-Muasher, a Christian, was dropped from the post to please the Jordanian Muslim Brotherhood.

From 2006 to 2007, he was a member of the Jordanian Senate.

=== International policy making ===
From March 2007 to 2010, he served as senior vice president of external affairs at the World Bank.

He currently serves as vice president for studies at the Carnegie Endowment for International Peace, where he oversees research on the Middle East from Washington, D.C., and Beirut, Lebanon. In 2011 Muasher took seat in the advisory council of The Hague Institute for Global Justice.

== Published works ==
He is the author of two books:

- The Arab Center: The Promise of Moderation. New Haven, CT: Yale University Press. 2008. p. 336. ISBN 978-0-300-12300-5.
- The Second Arab Awakening: And the Battle for Pluralism. New Haven, CT: Yale University Press. 2014. p. 232. ISBN 978-0-300-18639-0.

== Awards and recognition ==
Recipient of awards, including Jordanian Independence Medal and the Order of the Star of Jordan.
