= Sawsan Al Majali =

Jordanian politician (born 1960)

- Born: 1960 (age 65–66); Amman, Jordan
- Occupations: Politician; Academic; Nurse

Sawsan Abed Al Salam Al Majali (Arabic: سوسن عبد السلام المجالي, born 1960) is a Jordanian politician who was awarded the Independence Medal of Third Degree. She was born in the city of Amman and is a member of the 72nd Jordanian Senate.

== Early life ==
Al Majali is the daughter of Abdelsalam Majali, who was the prime minister of Jordan from 1993 until 1995. As Sawsan grew up and started taking multiple jobs, she admitted that many people thought she got her positions because of her father's high status in the country. In the same interview, she also spoke about her passion for nursing because both her mother and aunt were nurses.

== Education ==
Al Majali got her bachelor's degree in nursing from the University of Jordan in 1981. She later got her Masters of Science degree in nursing in 1984 from the Catholic University of America in the United States. She received her PhD in clinical nursing from the University of Michigan in 1990.

== Career and activism ==
Al Majali worked as a teaching research assistant in the Nursing Department at the University of Jordan after her graduation in 1981, and later she worked as a professor of nursing in 1984. She continued working in the Faculty of Nursing until she got promoted as a teaching assistant in 1991 and then as a co-professor in 2003. In addition to her academic work, she served as director of the University of Jordan's Community Service Office in 1999 and as Secretary-General of the Higher Population Council between 2013 and 2016.

Other positions that Al Majali occupied are in the administration of the Nursing Program at the College of Female Student Affairs and the College of Dar Al-Hekma in Saudi Arabia between 2002 and 2010. Al Majali also served as director of the Queen Zein Al Sharaf Institute for Development (ZENID) and Deputy Executive Director for Strategic Planning at the Jordanian Hashemite Fund for Human Development (JOHUD) between 2010 and 2013. In her position as a Deputy Executive Director for Strategic Planning at JOHUD, she oversaw the Oxfam Regional Project for Women's Economic Empowerment at ZENID and founded the disability and early childhood program. Al Majali was elected to the Jordanian Senate in 2016, and she served as the chair of the Senate Labor and Development Committee. Al Majali has been a member of the Board of Trustees of the National Council for Family Affairs in Jordan and the National Center for Human Rights.

Al Majali is an expert in the fields of nursing education, social responsibility, community development, and various aspects of healthcare. Al Majali was also an advocate for women's rights in the Jordanian Senate.
