= 1934 Transjordanian general election =

General elections were held in Transjordan on 16 October 1934.

== Electoral system ==
The 1928 basic law provided for a unicameral Legislative Council. The 16 elected members were joined by the six-member cabinet, which included the Prime Minister. The term length was set at three years.

== Results ==
The sixteen elected members were:

- Majed al-Adwan
- Wasef al-Bsharat
- Methqal al-Faiez
- Mahmud al-Fniash
- Nathmi Abd al-Hadi
- Mahmud al-Kreshan
- Refefan al-Majali
- Fawzi al-Mulqi
- Alhajj Fawzi al-Nabelsi
- Salih al-Oran
- Alhajj As'ad al-Qalil
- Suleyman al-Qalil
- Abdullah al-Kulayb
- Falah al-Thaher
- Metri al-Zraiqat
- Hamad Bin Jazi

== Aftermath ==
Ibrahim Hashem formed a government that included Odeh Al-Qsous, Sa`id al-Mufti, Shukri Sha'sha'h, Hashem Khiar and Qasem Al-Hindawi. It became the first government to last a full Council term.
