= Zaid Rifai =

Jordanian politician (1936–2024)

His Excellency Zaid al-Rifai
- زيد الرفاعي
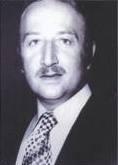

President of the Senate
- In office 8 June 1997 – 17 December 2009
- Monarch: Abdullah II
- Preceded by: Ahmad al-Lawzi
- Succeeded by: Taher Nashat al-Masri

Prime Minister of Jordan
- In office 4 April 1985 – 27 April 1989
- Monarch: Hussein
- Preceded by: Ahmad Obeidat
- Succeeded by: Zaid ibn Shaker
- In office 26 May 1973 – 13 July 1976
- Monarch: Hussein
- Preceded by: Ahmad al-Lawzi
- Succeeded by: Mudar Badran

Personal details
- Born: Zaid Sameer al-Rifai; 27 November 1936 Amman, Transjordan, British Empire
- Died: 12 August 2024 (aged 87) Amman, Jordan
- Children: Samir Rifai (son)
- Relatives: Al-Rifai family
- Education: Harvard University
- Profession: Politician

Zaid al-Rifai (Arabic: زيد الرفاعي; 27 November 1936 – 12 August 2024) was a Jordanian politician who served as the 22nd prime minister of Jordan, holding office from May 1973 to July 1976 and again from April 1985 to April 1989. His second tenure remains the longest uninterrupted government in Jordan’s history. In addition to his role as prime minister, al-Rifai served as the president of the Senate of Jordan from 1997 to 2009.

== Early life and education ==
Zaid al-Rifai was born in Amman in 1936 to a prominent Jordanian political family. His father, Sameer al-Rifai, and his uncle, Abdelmunim al-Rifai, both served as prime ministers of Jordan. His father-in-law, Bahjat Talhouni, and his son, Samir Rifai, also held the same position.

He attended Victoria College, before attaining a bachelor's degree from Harvard University and a master's in law and international relations from Columbia University.

== Career ==
=== Assassination attempt (1971) ===
Before serving as prime minister, al-Rifai survived an assassination attempt on 15 December 1971 while he was Jordan's ambassador to the United Kingdom. The attack was carried out by members of Fatah in response to the Black September conflict, during which Jordan expelled Palestinian militant groups following clashes between the Jordanian military and the PLO.

=== First premiership (1973–1976) ===
Al-Rifai was appointed Prime Minister of Jordan in May 1973. During his first tenure, Jordan navigated significant regional developments, including the 1973 Arab-Israeli War and its aftermath. He was in office when the Arab League recognized the Palestine Liberation Organization (PLO) as the sole legitimate representative of the Palestinian people in 1974.

=== Second premiership (1985–1989) ===
Al-Rifai returned to the position of prime minister in April 1985, leading Jordan's longest-serving government until April 1989. During this time, Jordan maintained its policy of granting Jordanian citizenship to Palestinians in the West Bank, a policy that continued until 31 July 1988, when Jordan officially renounced its claims to the West Bank and severed administrative ties.

His tenure also saw economic and political challenges, including growing demands for political reform and the rising influence of opposition movements. In April 1989, shortly after his resignation, widespread protests over economic conditions erupted, leading to the eventual democratization efforts under King Hussein.

=== Senate presidency (1997–2009) ===
Following his premiership, al-Rifai was appointed President of the Senate of Jordan in June 1997, a position he held until 2009. He resigned from the position and politics in 2009.

== Death ==
Zaid al-Rifai died on 12 August 2024 at the age of 87.

== See also ==
- List of prime ministers of Jordan

Political offices
Preceded by Ahmad al-Lawzi	Prime Minister of Jordan; 1973–1976	Succeeded by Mudar Badran
Preceded by Ahmad Obeidat	Prime Minister of Jordan; 1985–1989	Succeeded by Zaid ibn Shaker
