= Hazza' Majali =

Prime minister of Jordan

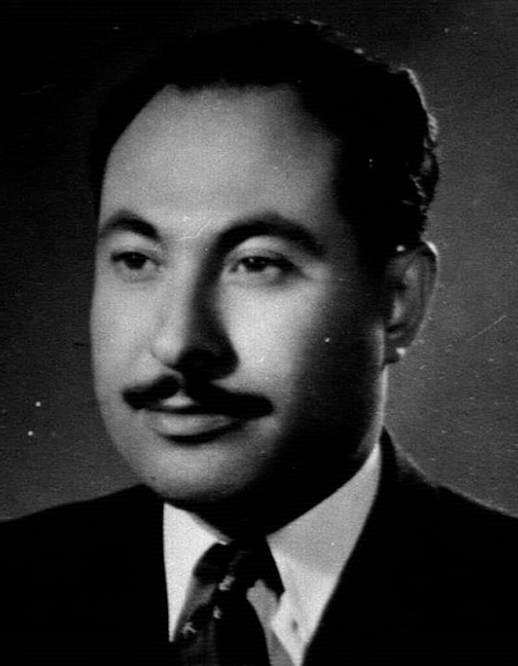
- Hazza' Majali

11th Prime Minister of Jordan
- In office 6 May 1959 – 29 August 1960
- Monarch: Hussein
- Preceded by: Samir al-Rifai
- Succeeded by: Bahjat Talhouni
- In office 15 December 1955 – 21 December 1955
- Monarch: Hussein
- Preceded by: Sa`id al-Mufti
- Succeeded by: Ibrahim Hashem

Minister of Agriculture
- In office 1950–1951

Minister of Justice
- In office 1951, 1954 – 1955

Minister of Interior
- In office 1953 – 1954, 1955

Personal details
- Born: 1917; Madaba, Ottoman Empire (present-day Jordan)
- Died: 29 August 1960 (aged 42–43)
- Spouse: Samiha Rfifan al-Majali
- Children: 5, including Ayman, Taghrid and Hussein
- Relatives: Habis al-Majali (cousin)

Hazza' Barakat al-Majali (1917 – 29 August 1960) (Arabic: هزاع بركات المجالي) was a Jordanian politician who served as the two-time 11th Prime Minister of Jordan. His first term lasted one week in 1955, his second term lasted from mid-1959 until his assassination.

== Education ==
Majali was born in Madaba, Jordan in 1917. He was the son of a sayyid of the Majali tribe. He attended an elementary school in Ma'een, then transferred to Al-Raba School in Al-Karak, followed by Al-Karak School, and finally to Al-Salt school for his secondary education. Hazza' later studied law in Damascus.

== Jordanian government positions ==
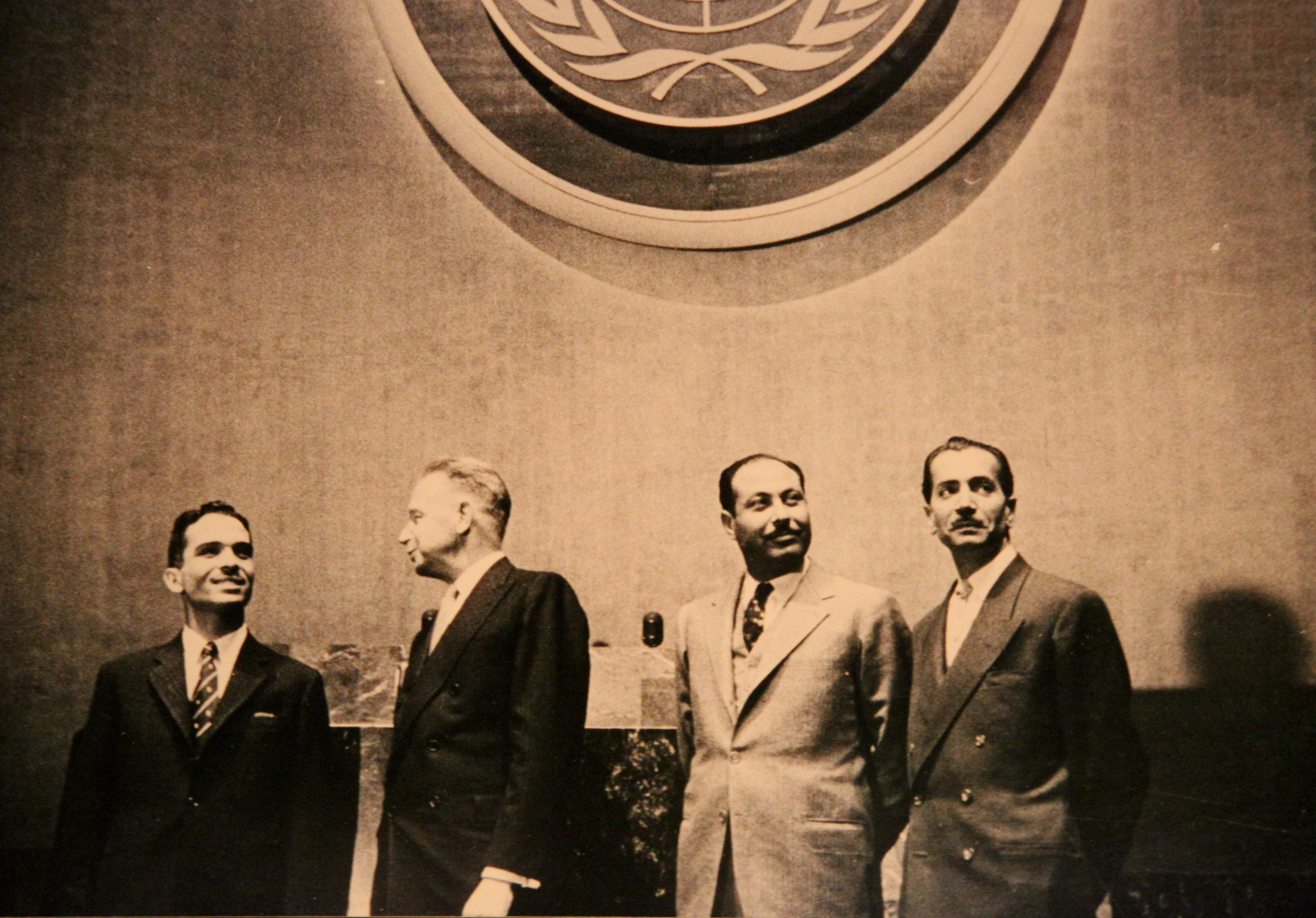
King Hussein of Jordan (left) U.N Secretary General Dag Hammarskjöld (Middle-left) Premier Hazza' Al Majali (Middle-Right) Abdelmunim al-Rifai (right) at the U.N committee

After high school, Majali worked for the Department of Land and Survey followed by the Madaba Court. After that, he studied law in Damascus and returned to Jordan to work for the "Royal Protocol". He was appointed by King Abdullah I as Chairman of the Greater Amman Municipality, then served as the Minister of Agriculture (1950–1951) and as the Minister of Justice (1951 and 1954–1955) under Prime Minister Sameer al-Rifai. He won two Parliamentary elections to represent Al-Karak in the Jordanian Parliament, once in 1951 and again in 1954. He was also appointed the Minister of Interior (1953–1954 and 1955). Hazza' first served as Prime Minister on 15 December 1955 when King Hussein tried to join the Baghdad Pact, but quickly resigned on 20 December 1955 following popular protests making his first government the shortest lasting government in Jordan's history. He was re-appointed Prime Minister on 6 May 1959. He picked Wasfi al-Tal to be his assistant during this term. Majali was assassinated at his office on 29 August 1960.

== Personal life ==
Majali married Samiha Rfifan al-Majali, the sister of Habis al-Majali. Together they had 5 children (3 boys and 2 girls). His eldest son, Amjad Hazza' al-Majali, served as the Jordanian Ambassador in Bahrain and Greece, and eventually became Minister of Labor during the government of Ali Abu al-Ragheb. His second eldest son, Ayman Hazza' al-Majali, served as Chief of Royal Protocol for King Hussein in the 1990s until the King's death in 1999, and then served as Deputy Prime Minister during the government of Abdelraouf al-Rawabdeh. His eldest daughter, Taghrid Hazza' Majali, married Prince Muhammad bin Talal, brother of King Hussein, in 1981. His second eldest daughter Zein Hazza' Majali is a businesswoman. His youngest son, Hussein Hazza' al-Majali, who graduated from The Citadel, The Military College of South Carolina, served in the Jordanian military and became head of the Royal Guard under King Hussein in the 1990s, Jordan's Ambassador in Bahrain until 2010 the chief of the Jordanian Public Security Department. And the minister of Interior Affairs in the government of Abdullah Al Nsour.

== Assassination ==
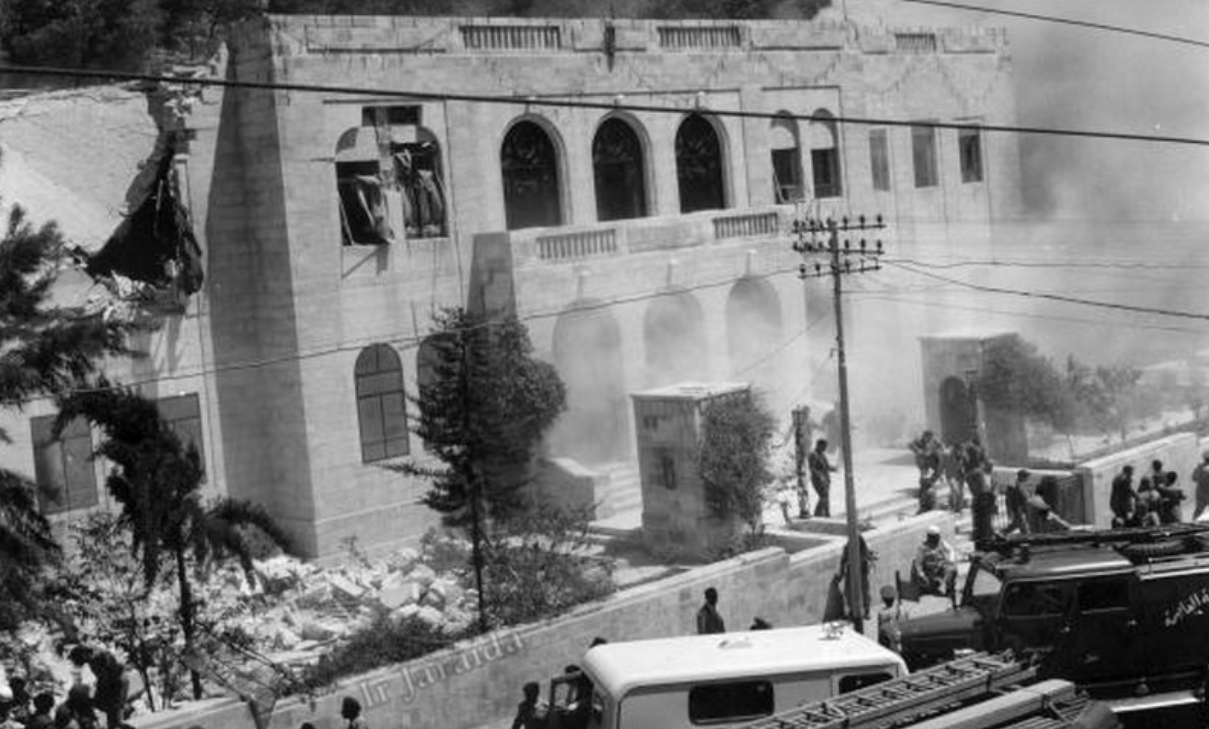
Smoke rising out of the Jordanian Foreign Ministry building after the explosion that killed Prime Minister Hazza' Majali on 29 August 1960. The Syrian government was suspected of being responsible.

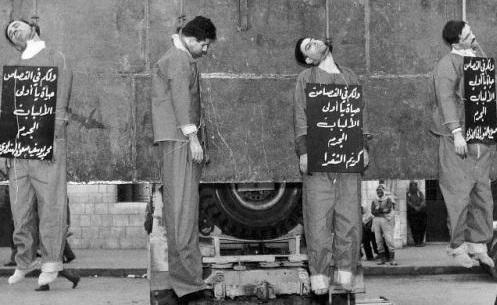
Convicts in Majali's assassination hanged, 31 December 1960.

At around 10:30 am on 29 August 1960, a bomb exploded in Majali's office, killing him and 12 other people including senior officials in the government.

== See also ==
- List of prime ministers of Jordan
- Abdelsalam al-Majali

Political offices
Preceded by Sa`id al-Mufti	Prime Minister of Jordan; 1955	Succeeded by Ibrahim Hashem
Preceded by Samir al-Rifai	Prime Minister of Jordan; 1959–1960	Succeeded by Bahjat Talhouni
