= Hasan Abu Al-Huda =

Prime minister of Transjordan

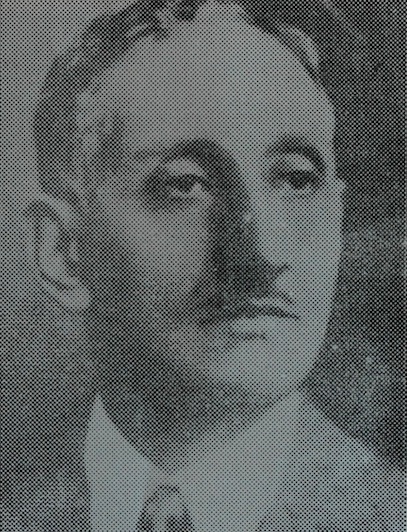

4th Prime Minister of Transjordan
- In office 5 September 1923 – 3 March 1924
- Monarch: Abdullah I
- Preceded by: Mazhar Raslan
- Succeeded by: Ali Rikabi
- In office 26 June 1926 – 22 February 1931
- Monarch: Abdullah I
- Preceded by: Ali Rikabi
- Succeeded by: Abdullah Siraj

Minister of Finance
- In office 1924–1926
- Prime Minister: Ali Rikabi
- Preceded by: Ahmed Hilmi Pasha
- Succeeded by: Alan Kirkbride

Personal details
- Born: 1871 Aleppo, Ottoman Empire
- Died: December 22, 1937 (aged 65–66) Jerusalem
- Resting place: Amman
- Spouse: Devlet Abu Gabal

Hasan Khaled Abu Al-Huda CBE (Arabic: حسن خالد ابو الهدى; 1871 – 1937) was a Jordanian politician and statesman who served as the 4th Prime Minister of Transjordan twice in 1923–24 and 1926–1931. He was Minister of Finance from 1924 to 1926.

== Family and early life ==
Hasan Khaled was the son of Abu al-Huda al-Sayyadi, an Islamic scholar from Khan Shaykhun, Syria, who claimed descent from the Sufi saint Ahmad al-Rifa'i. Sayyadi was the leader of the Rifa'i Sufi order, the Sheikh al-Islam, the chief Naqib al-Ashraf and religious adviser of Sultan Abdulhamid II on Arab affairs. Hasan Khaled spent most of his childhood in Istanbul, where his family resided. He married an Egyptian of Turkish origins, Devlet Abu Gabal, with whom he had two daughters, Velia Abdel-Huda (1916-2012), an Oxford-educated socialite and art historian, and Halime Lima Hanımefendi (1919-2000), who married Şehzade Mehmed Nazım, the son of Şehzade Mehmed Ziyaeddin; and a son, Taj al-Din, who, like his grandfather, had been more religiously inclined and was appointed president of the Aleppan Ashraf in 1942.

Following the Young Turk Revolution, Hasan Khaled is said to have escaped Istanbul to Paris, where he funded himself using the proceeds of a company which he sold. Later, he moved to Alexandria to reside with family. For a time, he resided in the house of Hussein al-Qasab. During this period, he is said to have intrigued with al-Qasab and other Arab nationalists.

== Foreign honours ==
- United Kingdom:
  - Honorary Commander of the Order of the British Empire

== See also ==
- Politics of Jordan
