= Zeid bin Shaker =

Jordanian military officer and prime minister (1934–2002)

HRH Prince Zaid ibn Shaker
- زيد بن شاكر
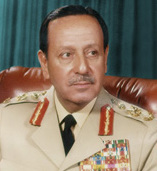

Prime Minister of Jordan
- In office 8 January 1995 – 4 February 1996
- Monarch: Hussein
- Preceded by: Abdelsalam al-Majali
- Succeeded by: Abdul Karim al-Kabariti
- In office 21 November 1991 – 29 May 1993
- Monarch: Hussein
- Preceded by: Taher al-Masri
- Succeeded by: Abdelsalam al-Majali
- In office 27 April 1989 – 6 December 1989
- Monarch: Hussein
- Preceded by: Zaid al-Rifai
- Succeeded by: Mudar Badran

Personal details
- Born: 4 September 1934 Amman, Emirate of Transjordan
- Died: 30 August 2002 (aged 67) Amman, Jordan
- Party: Independent
- Relations: Hashemites
- Parent: Shaker ibn Zaid (father)
- Education: US Army Command and General Staff College
- Website: http://www.zaidbinshaker.com

Military service
- Allegiance: Jordan
- Branch/service: Jordanian Army
- Years of service: 1951–1988
- Rank: Field marshal
- Battles/wars: Six-Day War; War of Attrition; Battle of Karameh; Black September

Zaid ibn Shaker, GBE, CVO (4 September 1934 – 30 August 2002) (Arabic: الامير زيد بن شاكر) was a Jordanian military officer and politician who served as the commander-in-chief of the Jordanian military for more than twelve years and the 27th Prime Minister of Jordan three times. King Hussein awarded him the non-hereditary title of prince on 4 February 1996.

Field Marshal General of the Army Sharif Zaid ibn Shakir was a cousin of King Hussein. He joined the military and served with the future King Hussein. In 1957 and 1958 he was the assistant military attache at the Embassy of Jordan in London. He served in a number of positions in the Jordanian military, including being a tank commander at both the brigade and division level. On 8 January 1996 he was made chief of staff for the armed services, which post he held until resigning in 1988. In June 1987 he was made field marshal. Being a Hashemite, Zaid ibn Shaker's family had always been close to the Royal family, and Zaid ibn Shaker himself had been personally linked with King Hussein throughout his military career. In addition to his high palace position, he also filled a then newly created post of adviser to the king on national security, which implied that Zaid bin Shaker would retain considerable influence over military policies.

== Early life ==
Ibn Shaker was born on September 4, 1934, in Amman. His father, Shakir Ibn Zaid, had participated in the Arab Revolt during the First World War, where he led a group of tribal levies, as well as in the Al-Khurma dispute. At the Battle of Turbah, during the conflict between the Sharifian Caliphate and Ibn Saud, Ibn Shakir's father saved the life of Prince Abdullah (later King Abdullah I) by providing him a horse and camel to escape. Zaid's father had likewise served with T. E. Lawrence, who described him as a "brave and courageous soldier".

Ibn Shaker would go on to be educated at Victoria College in Alexandria.

Ibn Shaker would eventually be married and have two sons: Shaker and Nasreen.

== Military career ==
Ibn Shaker was trained at Sandhurst in the early 1950s, where he met Hussein, and during this time the two became close friends. Returning to Jordan in 1956, Ibn Shaker was among a group of officers who participated in the Arabization of the Jordanian Army command. During the Zarqa incident, when Shaker was Hussein's aide-de-camp, he was sent to the Zarqa barracks to ascertain the situation. He found anarchic conditions, with rumors circling that the king had been assassinated, and uncertainty regarding individual loyalties. The arrival of the king eventually quelled confusion, and order was restored.

In 1957, he was appointed an assistant to the Jordanian military attache in Britain, and would hold that position until 1958.

In 1963, he would attend the Command and General Staff College in the United States. Afterward, he would command the 1st Infantry Regiment.

=== Six Day War ===
In the events leading up to the war in 1967, Jordanian public opinion was strongly in favor of war. Ibn Shaker commented at a press conference in May of that year, "If Jordan does not join the war a civil war will erupt in Jordan."

By the time conflict broke out, Jordanian forces were under the command of Egyptian General Abdul Munim Riad. Ibn Shaker was in charge of the 60th Armored brigade, then stationed in the Ain Qilt-Jericho area, which was, along with the 40th Armored Brigade, one of the key armored units in the Arab nations' Western Command. Eventually, the 60th Armored was moved south to Hebron, while the 40th Armored was moved north to Jericho. This was based on the idea that the Syrians would move in to support the northern end, while Egypt would move in to support the southern end - neither event materialized. When the Israelis launched their preemptive attack, the Jordanians suffered greatly from the Israeli air superiority. The 60th Armored Brigade alone lost half of its eighty tanks, mostly to air attacks. The air attacks were so severe that Ibn Shaker recalled nearly being killed by napalm:

When you're strafed you have to jump out of your vehicle - I was in a Land Rover - and throw yourself in a ditch. They hit the wireless car behind me. They used a lot of napalm. A napalm bomb ricocheted on the asphalt near me, went about 200 yards and exploded. God was on my side.

=== Battle of Karameh ===
During the War of Attrition, Ibn Shaker was stationed on the border between Israel and Jordan. Although he was opposed to Palestinian activities against Israel, he was also opposed to Israeli attacks on Jordanian soil. On March 20, 1968, while gazing out at the Israeli side, he noticed the oncoming attack. "They were massing their forces," he would later say, "and not even bothering to hide their attack." He went to Karameh and inspected the Palestinian positions there. Assured that they were prepared, he went back to Amman to attend the birthday party of Crown Prince Hassan ibn Talal, the king's brother. During the party, Hussein took Ibn Shaker aside and said, "You should leave early and try to get some sleep. The attack will probably happen tomorrow." Sure enough, at 5:00 A.M., Hussein was told that the Israelis were crossing the river into Jordanian territory. He telephoned his officers, Ibn Shakir among them, and said, "The fun has started."

The Jordanian forces fought well, and were aided by a low cloud cover that hampered the Israeli ground-attack aircraft. The Israelis retreated into their territory after ten hours of fighting. A total of 29 Israeli soldiers were killed, while the Jordanians lost 40 servicemen, and the Palestinians 128. Yasser Arafat claimed the battle as a victory for the Palestinians, much to the chagrin of Hussein.

After the battle, Ibn Shaker led a tribute to those who had died in the battle at the Tomb of the Unknown Soldier. He later revealed a new monument to the Karameh martyrs in Irbid.

=== Black September ===
Ibn Shaker was opposed to the freedom granted to the fedayeen forces of the Palestine Liberation Organization (PLO). When clashes broke out between Jordanian and Palestinian fedayeen guerrillas in June 1970, the PLO demanded Ibn Shaker's dismissal. Fearing that opposition to the fedayeen would only result in all out conflict, Hussein conceded, and announced Ibn Shaker's resignation. Later that month, fedayeen guerillas not only attempted to kill the king, but also killed Jozza Ibn Shaker, Ibn Shaker's sister.

Ibn Shaker's dismissal did nothing to ease tension, and by late August fighting between the fedayeen and Jordanian army was a near daily occurrence. As a result, Ibn Shaker was reappointed Deputy Chief of Staff. The PLO saw his return to power as a sign that Jordan was "determined to strike and liquidate the resistance movement". As the situation in Jordan escalated, the international community began to lose faith in Hussein's ability to lead. This, combined with pressure from his top generals (Ibn Shaker included) and members of the political elite, led Hussein to decide on military action.

For two weeks, Ibn Shaker planned attacks against fedayeen positions within Amman with his 60th Armored Brigade. The Jordanians had over 35,000 troops, the bulk of the Jordanian combat units at the time. Despite this, the Jordanian military still met with problems due to dated weaponry and narrow streets of the city, which provided perfect defense cover for the fedayeen. Ethnic Palestinians in the Jordanian army deserted to join the fedayeen, and soon PLO forces had taken over Irbid and most of northern Jordan.

On September 19, 300 Syrian tanks attacked Jordanian forces in the Irbid region. They were eventually driven off after attacks from the Jordanian air force, as well as backing from the United States and Israel. Regarding the Syrian incursion into Jordan, Ibn Shaker would later remark: "Some of us, including myself, did not really think the Syrians would attack. We didn't believe that an Arab country would attack another Arab country... but we were proved wrong."

During an interim in the attacks against the PLO, Ibn Shaker was given command over the operations. He assisted the general staff learned from previous mistakes, and used those lessons for further operations. With this new direction - along with new armor from the United States - a renewed offensive was launched in November 1970. The first phase of the operation saw the retaking of major urban areas such as Amman, Ajlun, and Jarash. In the second phase, the Jordanian army pushed the PLO out of the cities and towns and into the hills Ajlun and north-central Jordan. From town to town, refugee camp to refugee camp, the Jordanians purged civilian areas of any PLO personnel. Massive firepower and indiscriminately were employed. By April 1971, all PLO fighters were out of Amman, and the fedayeen had been pushed into a pocket of defense between Ajlun and Jarash. On July 13, the last offensive against the PLO was launched, and on July 18 the last of the fedayeen surrendered.

=== 1971-1989 ===
In 1972, Ibn Shaker was appointed Chief of Staff. In 1976, he took the position of Commander in Chief.

In 1984, when Hussein was beginning talks with Yasser Arafat for the creation of a Palestinian state, Ibn Shakir opposed Jordanian support, worried that it would create a recurrence of Black September.

In 1987, Ibn Shakir was promoted to field marshal.

In 1988, Ibn Shakir was appointed Chief of the Royal Court, as well as director of the Mukhabarat.

== Political career ==
=== Prime Minister (1989) ===
In 1989, price increases related to the IMF-mandated austerity program caused riots in Amman and several Jordanian cities, leading to the resignation of Jordanian government under Prime Minister Zaid Rifai. Ibn Shakir was appointed prime minister, with orders to curb corruption, ease discontent over unpopular economic measures, and arrange a general election as soon as possible. At the time, Ibn Shaker was seen as an intermediary between those who opposed elections and the reformers who desired elections.

In November of that year, parliamentary elections were held in Jordan, the very first since 1967. Mudar Badran was elected as prime minister.

After this, Ibn Shakir continued as a close adviser to the king.

=== Prime minister (1991–1993) ===
Taher Masri resigned as prime minister after the collapse of his government. Ibn Shaker was once again called in, this time to reform the economy, renew Arab unity which had been damaged since the invasion of Iraq, and reach accommodation for the Muslim Brotherhood. However, Shaker's government generally favored the conservatives and ignored the Brotherhood. It survived a nonconfidence motion in December 1991, at a vote of 46–27. In 1992, all martial law regulations imposed by King Hussein since the 1967 war were removed, and political parties were once again allowed to register.

Abdelsalam Majali was appointed prime minister of a transitional government in 1993.

=== Prime minister (1995–1996) ===
After Abdelsalam Majali resigned as prime minister, Ibn Shaker was once again appointed. The government emphasized their economic plans, but primarily focused on normalizing relations with Israel. This was due to the vocal opposition to the peace treaty with Israel, which had been stronger than the government expected. Hussein adopted a hard line stance towards opponents of the accords, and banned meetings against it by Islamist, leftist, and nationalist groups. This stifled dissent "even at the expense, in the opinion of some observers, of a slowdown of the democratization process." During this time Israel completed their withdrawal from Jordanian territory. Ibn Shaker also attempted to clear the way for increased trade and investment by implementing economic normalization.

Eventually, Hussein would appoint Abdul Karim Kabariti as prime minister in February 1996.

== Later life ==
Ibn Shaker was granted the title emir in 1996.

At the age of 68, Ibn Shaker died of a heart attack on August 30, 2002, in Amman. His funeral was held in the Royal Guard Mosque, and he was buried in the royal tombs.

== Legacy ==
At his funeral, Prime Minister Ali Abu Al-Ragheb praised Ibn Shaker.

Middle Eastern military and political affairs analyst Kenneth M. Pollack listed Zaid ibn Shaker as an example of Arab generals in recent decades who had proven to be "first-rate generals", listing him alongside Syria's Ali Aslan and Iraq's Husayn Rashid Muhammad at-Tikriti.

== See also ==
- List of prime ministers of Jordan

== Notes ==
Political offices
Preceded by Zaid al-Rifai	Prime Minister of Jordan; 1989–1989	Succeeded by Mudar Badran
Preceded by Taher Al-Masri	Prime Minister of Jordan; 1991–1993	Succeeded by Abdelsalam al-Majali
Preceded by Abdelsalam al-Majali	Prime Minister of Jordan; 1995–1996	Succeeded by Abdelkarim al-Kabariti
