= Ali al-Rikabi =

Jordanian politician (1864–1942)

Ali Rida al-Rikabi رضا باشا الركابي
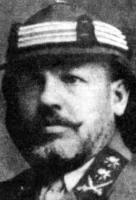

3rd Prime Minister of Transjordan
- In office 3 March 1924 – 26 June 1926
- Monarch: Abdullah I
- Preceded by: Hasan Khalid Abu al-Huda
- Succeeded by: Hasan Khalid Abu al-Huda
- In office 10 March 1922 – 1 February 1923
- Monarch: Abdullah I
- Preceded by: Mazhar Raslan
- Succeeded by: Mazhar Raslan

Prime Minister of Syria
- In office 8 March 1920 – 3 May 1920
- Monarch: Faisal I
- Preceded by: Office Established
- Succeeded by: Hashim al-Atassi

Personal details
- Born: 1864 Damascus, Ottoman Syria, Ottoman Empire
- Died: May 25, 1943 (aged 78–79) Damascus, Syria

Ali Rida al-Rikabi (Arabic: علي رضا باشا الركابي; 1864 – 25 May 1943) was an Arab politician from Syria during and after the Dissolution of the Ottoman Empire.

Originally from Damascus, he made a career in the Ottoman Army, rising to the rank of major general. During the Arab Revolt he joined the side of the Arab nationalists and was appointed military governor of the Occupied Enemy Territory Administration (OETA) East in October 1918. Subsequently he became the first Prime Minister of the Arab Kingdom of Syria under Faisal I from March to May 1920. He was also the 3rd Prime Minister of Transjordan under Emir Abdullah I, serving from 1922 to 1923 and again from 1924 to 1926.

== Summary ==
During the last phase of Ottoman rule in the Middle East, al-Rikabi occupied prominent positions. After the Ottoman Turks departed from Arab lands in 1918, he formed the first cabinet in the history of Syria under Prince Faisal, third son Sharif Hussain of Mecca. Later, during two periods (1922 and 1924–1926) as prime minister in Jordan, al-Rikabi established Jordan's administrative and financial system. He supported the Syrian revolt of 1925 against the French Mandate while he was Prime Minister of Jordan.

== During Ottoman rule ==
Ali Rida al-Rikabi came from a Damascene family whose ancestor had migrated from Rifa’i in southern Iraq during the seventeenth century. Al-Rikabi obtained his primary education at the Rushdiya Military School and completed Secondary school in Damascus also. His extraordinary performance at school earned him recommendations to be sent to the Military College in Istanbul, where he studied military engineering and graduated as the youngest in his class with the rank of Staff Major. He was later appointed military commander of the Ottoman army and deputy governor in Jerusalem. When the Ottoman Constitution was proclaimed in 1908 he was appointed Head of Special Branch in Istanbul. From there he was transferred to al-Medina al-Munawara where he was appointed Governor and Military Commander after being promoted to the rank of Major General. He then went on to Iraq as Military Commander in Baghdad and Governor of Basra.

On the eve of the First World the Ottoman Government consulted him, among other army commanders, about his opinion of Turkey's participation in the war along the side of its German ally. Al-Rikabi advised the Ottoman Government to remain neutral in this European conflict because he was well aware of the poor condition of the Ottoman Army, its outdated weapons, insufficient ammunition and weak training. Other officers and members of the Young Turks were enthusiastic in their drive to enter the war on the side of Germany, their friend and ally. When al-Rikabi returned to Damascus after his dismissal, Jamal Pasha appointed him Mayor of Damascus and Chief of Defences in order to utilise his knowledge and experience, while keeping him under close surveillance. Al-Rikabi preferred to accept these two positions to ward off suspicions, as he was in fact one of the founders of the first two secret organisations that planted the seeds of Arab Nationalism under Ottoman rule, namely The Young Arab Society and The Covenant Society.

== Arab Kingdom ==
After the Arab Revolt (1916) and the Ottoman defeat by the British army, the allies entered Damascus on 1 October 1918 with King Faisal, and the Arab kingdom of Syria created at Damascus. On 3 October 1918 Ali Rida al-Rikabi was appointed Military Governor of Arab Kingdom of Syria, and Chief of the Council of Directors (i.e. prime minister) of Syria under Prince Faisal son of King Hussain of Mecca.

== First Syrian Cabinet ==
On 8 March 1920 the First Syrian Conference (representative body) announced Syria's independence and proclaimed Faisal as King. Al-Rikabi became the first Prime Minister of Syria. From a base in Lebanon, the French Army under General Gouraud attacked the small Syrian volunteer force assembled in Maysaloon, defeated them, entered Damascus, proclaimed the French Mandate over Syria and Lebanon and forced King Faisal to leave Syria immediately.

== Rikabi in Jordan ==
When Rikabi felt he could no longer participate in Syrian politics under the French Mandate, he travelled from Damascus to Egypt, where he left his family and went on to Mecca to meet King Hussain of Hejaz. The latter directed him to proceed to Jordan and assist his second son, Prince Abdullah, in the administration of the Principality of Transjordan, newly formed under the British Mandate.

In Amman, Prince Abdullah commissioned Rida Rikabi to form his first Jordanian cabinet in March 1922. So, he took up the task of setting suitable laws and regulations for the new State, particularly in administration and financial management. In October of that year he accompanied Prince Abdullah to London for conducting a treaty between Britain and Jordan and discussions of Arab Affairs thereat.

After Prince Abdullah left, Rikabi remained in London to reach an agreement with the British authorities on the formulation of the Government of Transjordan. Rikabi succeeded in obtaining Britain's approval for parliamentary independence of the State, and in excluding Jordan from the Balfour Declaration (by which Britain promised to establish a Jewish state in Palestine). After Rikabi returned to Jordan, Prince Abdullah objected to some terms of this agreement prompting Rikabi to resign.

In early 1924, Prince Abdullah invited Ali Rida al-Rikabi to form a new Jordanian cabinet, this time on the advice of King Faisal of Iraq, Abdullah's younger brother who had ruled briefly in Syria. Rikabi declared his cabinet's program for promoting justice among all citizens, economic reform, employing competent civil servants, eradicating corruption and ensuring security. Whilst such a program may seem rudimentary nowadays, it was a novelty when new Arab states were being established in the aftermath of four centuries under Ottoman oppression that only ended after First World War.

During Rikabi's second term as Prime Minister of Jordan, he secretly supported the Syrian Revolt against French rule. This was strongly backed by King Faisal of Iraq, overruling his elder brother Prince Abdullah on matters concerning the policies of his Prime Minister Rikabi, who set tactical plans for the Syrian Revolt, received Syrian casualties in Jordan and channelled Iraqi assistance to Syrian fighters.

After the Syrian Revolt was crushed by the French Rikabi resigned from the prime ministership of Jordan because it became once more impossible for him to work with Prince Abdullah.

== Final years ==
When Rikabi left Jordan in 1926 he lived as a private citizen for a few years in Jerusalem and Haifa because the French banned him from entry to Syria for a few years before he could return to Damascus. In 1932 he coordinated efforts with King Faisal of Iraq, established the Royal Party and ran for President of Syria. The French heavily supported his rival and Rikabi lost the elections.

He spent the last ten years of his life in seclusion at home, under constant harassment from the French and their agents. His health soon began failing and he died in May 1943.

== See also ==
- List of prime ministers of Jordan
