= Abdelsalam Majali =

Jordanian physician and politician (1925–2023)

Abdelsalam al-Majali
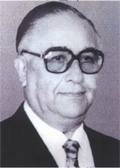

Prime Minister of Jordan
- In office 9 March 1997 – 20 August 1998
- Monarch: Hussein
- Preceded by: Abdul Karim al-Kabariti
- Succeeded by: Fayez al-Tarawneh
- In office 30 May 1993 – 7 January 1995
- Monarch: Hussein
- Preceded by: Zaid ibn Shaker
- Succeeded by: Zaid ibn Shaker

Personal details
- Born: Abdul Salam Attaullah al-Majali; 18 February 1925 Al-Karak, Emirate of Transjordan
- Died: 3 January 2023 (aged 97)
- Party: Independent
- Children: Sawsan Al Majali
- Education: Syrian University; Royal College for Physicians
- Profession: Otolaryngologist

Abdul Salam Attaullah al-Majali (/ˈɑːbdəl səˈlæm æl məˈdʒɑːli/ AHB-dəl sə-LAM al mə-JAH-lee; Arabic: عبد السلام المجالي; 18 February 1925 – 3 January 2023) was a Jordanian physician and politician who served twice as Prime Minister of Jordan.

== Early life and education ==
Majali was born in Al-Karak, Emirate of Transjordan, on 18 February 1925. He received his medical degree from Syrian University in Damascus in 1949. He also held a diploma of Laryngology and Otology from the Royal College of Physicians in London, which he obtained in 1953. He was awarded a fellowship by the American College of Surgeons in 1960. In 1974, he received the degree of Doctor Honoris Causa from Hacettepe University.

== Career ==
Majali was director of medical services for the Jordanian Armed Forces from 1960 to 1969. He also served as minister of health (1969–1971), minister of state for prime ministerial affairs (1970–1971 and 1976–1979) and also, minister of education (1976–1979). He was then named as president of the University of Jordan (1971–1976 and 1980–1989). In 1973, Majali was promoted to be a professor of medicine at the University of Jordan. He served as advisor to King Hussein starting in the late 1980s.

Majali was the prime minister from May 1993 to January 1995, during which time he signed the 1994 Israel–Jordan peace treaty. When he was appointed prime minister, he was also given the portfolio of foreign minister. On 5 January 1995, he resigned from office. He again was prime minister from March 1997 to August 1998, after which he was appointed to the Jordanian senate.

In January 2003 Majali was named as a member of the committee of patrons of the Anglo-Arab Organisation. As of 2013, Majali was chairman of the Islamic World Academy of Sciences.

== Personal life and death ==
Majali died on 3 January 2023, at the age of 97.

== See also ==
- Hazza' al-Majali

Political offices
Preceded by Zaid ibn Shaker	Prime Minister of Jordan; 1993–1995	Succeeded by Zaid ibn Shaker
Preceded by Abdelkarim al-Kabariti	Prime Minister of Jordan; 1997–1998	Succeeded by Fayez al-Tarawneh
