= Abdelmunim Rifai =

Jordanian politician (1917–1985)

عبد المنعم الرفاعي
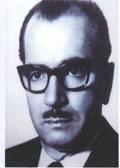

18th Prime Minister of Jordan
- In office 24 March 1969 – 13 August 1969
- Monarch: Hussein
- Preceded by: Bahjat Talhouni
- Succeeded by: Bahjat Talhouni
- In office 27 June 1970 – 15 September 1970
- Monarch: Hussein
- Preceded by: Bahjat Talhouni
- Succeeded by: Mohammad Daoud Al-Abbasi

Personal details
- Born: 23 February 1917 Tyre, Ottoman Syria
- Died: 17 October 1985 (aged 68) Amman, Jordan
- Party: Independent
- Relations: Zaid Al-Rifai (nephew); Samir Rifai (brother); Omar Al-Rifai (son); Abdul-Monem Al-Rifai (grandson); Seif Al-Rifai (Great Grandson); Tanya Al-Rifai (Great Granddaughter); Lana Al-Rifai (Great Granddaughter); Al-Rifai family

Abdelmunim Rifai (Arabic: عبد المنعم الرفاعي, romanized: ʿAbd al-Munʿim Rifāʿī; 23 February 1917 – 17 October 1985) was a prominent Jordanian political figure and held several significant positions within the government throughout his career, including serving as the 18th Prime Minister of Jordan in 1969 and 1970 and in various ministerial roles.

Rifai was also one of Jordan's most prominent poets and penned the lyrics of the Jordanian national and royal anthem.

== Early life ==
Abdulmunim Rifai was born on 23 February 1917 in Tyre, Lebanon, to Talib al Rifai a Palestinian originally from Safed, and Najla Bakkar a Southern Lebanese women. During his childhood, he lived with his family in Tyre, Safed, Tiberias and Beisan. He received his early education in Safed and Haifa. In 1926, he moved to Amman, where he completed his secondary education. In 1931, he enrolled at the American University of Beirut, graduating with a degree in Arabic literature in 1937. He was the younger brother of Samir Rifai and the uncle of Zaid Rifai.

== Political career ==
Rifai's political career began in 1938 when he was appointed private secretary to King Abdullah I of Jordan. He occupied many diplomatic posts over the succeeding years, including to the United States, the United Kingdom, Egypt, Lebanon, and the Arab League.

Rifai was appointed Jordan's first Ambassador and Permanent Representative of Jordan to the United Nations on 11 May 1956. He was succeeded by Yousef Haikal on 21 August 1957.

Rifai was appointed Minister of State for Foreign Affairs from 7 October 1967 to 25 April 1968. He was appointed Prime Minister of Jordan on 24 March 1969. He was replaced by his predecessor Bahjat Talhouni on August 13 of that same year.

Rifai's second Prime Ministership, beginning on June 27, 1970, was established with an obective to normalize relations with the Palestine Liberation Organization; upon Rifai's dismissal on September 15 of that same year, King Hussein of Jordan began the Black September conflict with the PLO.

Rifai served as Deputy Prime Minister several times during his career.

In 1973, Rifai served as the personal representative of King Hussein in the negotiations surrounding re-establishment of Jordan–Syria relations.

He remained a member of the Senate of Jordan until his death of a heart attack in October of 1985.

== See also ==
- List of prime ministers of Jordan

Political offices
Preceded by Bahjat Talhouni	Prime Minister of Jordan; 1969	Succeeded by Bahjat Talhouni
Preceded by Bahjat Talhouni	Prime Minister of Jordan; 1970	Succeeded by Mohammad Daoud Al-Abbasi
