= Ibrahim Hashem =

Jordanian politician, judge and prime minister (1886–1958)

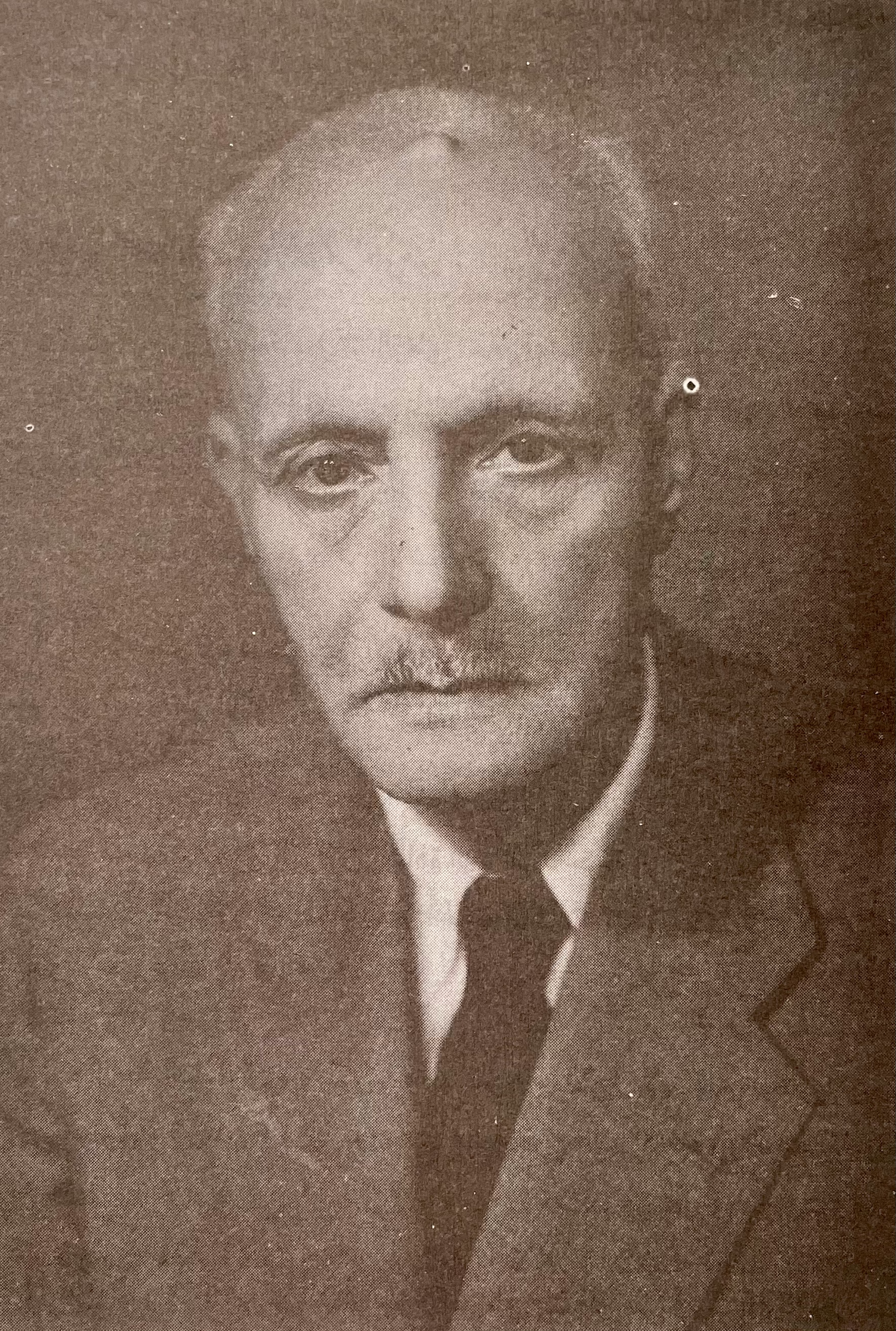

Vice President of the Arab Federation
- In office 18 May 1958 – 14 July 1958
- President: Nuri al-Said

Prime Minister of Jordan
- In office 24 April 1958 – 18 May 1958
- Monarch: Hussein I
- Preceded by: Husayin al-Khalidi
- Succeeded by: Samir al-Rifai
- In office 1 July 1956 – 29 October 1956
- Monarch: Hussein I
- Preceded by: Sa`id al-Mufti
- Succeeded by: Sulayman al-Nabulsi
- In office 21 December 1955 – 7 January 1956
- Monarch: Hussein I
- Preceded by: Hazza al-Majali
- Succeeded by: Samir al-Rifai
- In office 25 May 1946 – 4 February 1947
- Monarch: Abdullah I
- Preceded by: Samir al-Rifai
- Succeeded by: Tawfik Abu al-Huda

Prime Minister of Transjordan
- In office 18 October 1933 – 27 September 1938
- Monarch: Abdullah I
- Preceded by: Abd Allah Siraj
- Succeeded by: Tawfik Abu al-Huda

Minister of Justice
- In office 18 October 1933 – 27 September 1938
- Monarch: Abdullah I of Jordan
- Prime Minister: Himself
- Preceded by: Omar Hikmet
- Succeeded by: Toufic Abou El Hoda
- In office 1 November 1929 – 22 February 1931
- Prime Minister: Hasan Abu Al-Huda
- Preceded by: Sheikh Hussamuddin Jarallah
- Succeeded by: Omar Hikmet
- In office 3 May 1924 – 31 March 1926
- Prime Minister: Ali Rikabi
- Succeeded by: Reda Tawfiq
- In office 5 September 1923 – 3 May 1924
- Prime Minister: Hasan Abu Al-Huda
- In office 1 February 1923 – 5 September 1923
- Prime Minister: Mazhar Raslan
- In office 10 May 1922 – 28 January 1923
- Prime Minister: Ali Rikabi

Personal details
- Born: 1888 Nablus, Ottoman Empire
- Died: 14 July 1958 (aged 69–70) Baghdad, Arab Federation
- Party: Arab Istiqlalist Party (1918–1924)
- Education: Istanbul Law Faculty
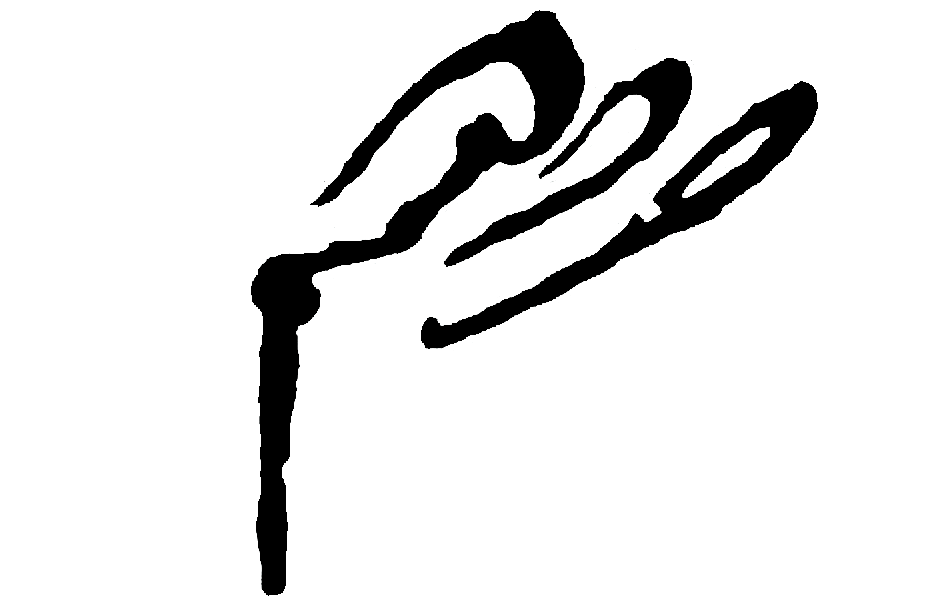
- Signature

Ibrahim Hashem CBE (Arabic: إبراهيم هاشم; 1886 – 14 July 1958) was a Jordanian politician and judge, known primarily for serving five terms as Prime Minister of Jordan.

Part of a Jordanian delegation that visited Iraq when both countries were part of the Arab Federation, Hashem was assassinated in Baghdad at the hands of a mob in front of the headquarters of the Iraqi Ministry of Defence during the 1958 Iraqi coup d'état.

== Early life ==
Hashem was born in Nablus to a family which claimed to have descended from the Prophet. He grew up with four siblings, Shaker (great-grandfather of Alia), Yakub, Areefah, and Zaha. There are claims that he moved to Istanbul to receive education in 1904, when he was 16 years of age. In 1906, he enrolled at the Law School in Istanbul and graduated in 1910. After graduation, Hashem worked as an assistant to the Prosecutor General of Beirut, and as a judge in Jaffa until the outbreak of World War One. Though Hashem was enlisted as an Ottoman reserve officer during the War, he chose to flee after six months of service, owing to the massacre of Arab activists by Jamal Pasha. Like many other nationalist turncoats, Hashem became a member of the secret Fatat party. He was imprisoned by the Jamal Pasha in Jabal al-Druze and sentenced to death for desertion. Once again, Hashem managed to get away from the Ottomans. He hid in Nablus until 1918. Throughout the War, Hashem covertly participated in the Great Arab Revolt. He is said to have had "many secret meetings with Emir Shakir Bin Zayd" and to have "actively ventured in enlisting many chiefs, activists and tribal leaders to the Arab Revolt". Around this time, he pledged allegiance to the Arab Istiqlalist party.

== Early career in Arab Kingdom of Syria and relocation to Transjordan ==
During the short-lived Arab Kingdom of Syria, he held the positions of the Prosecutor General of the Syrian Court of Appeal and the President of the Court of Appeal. He taught penal law at the law faculty of Damascus University. Though he moved to Jordan following the French occupation of Syria, Hashem continued to publish books on Penal Law which were taught at the Damascus law faculty until the mid-1920s.

== Ministerial service in Transjordan ==
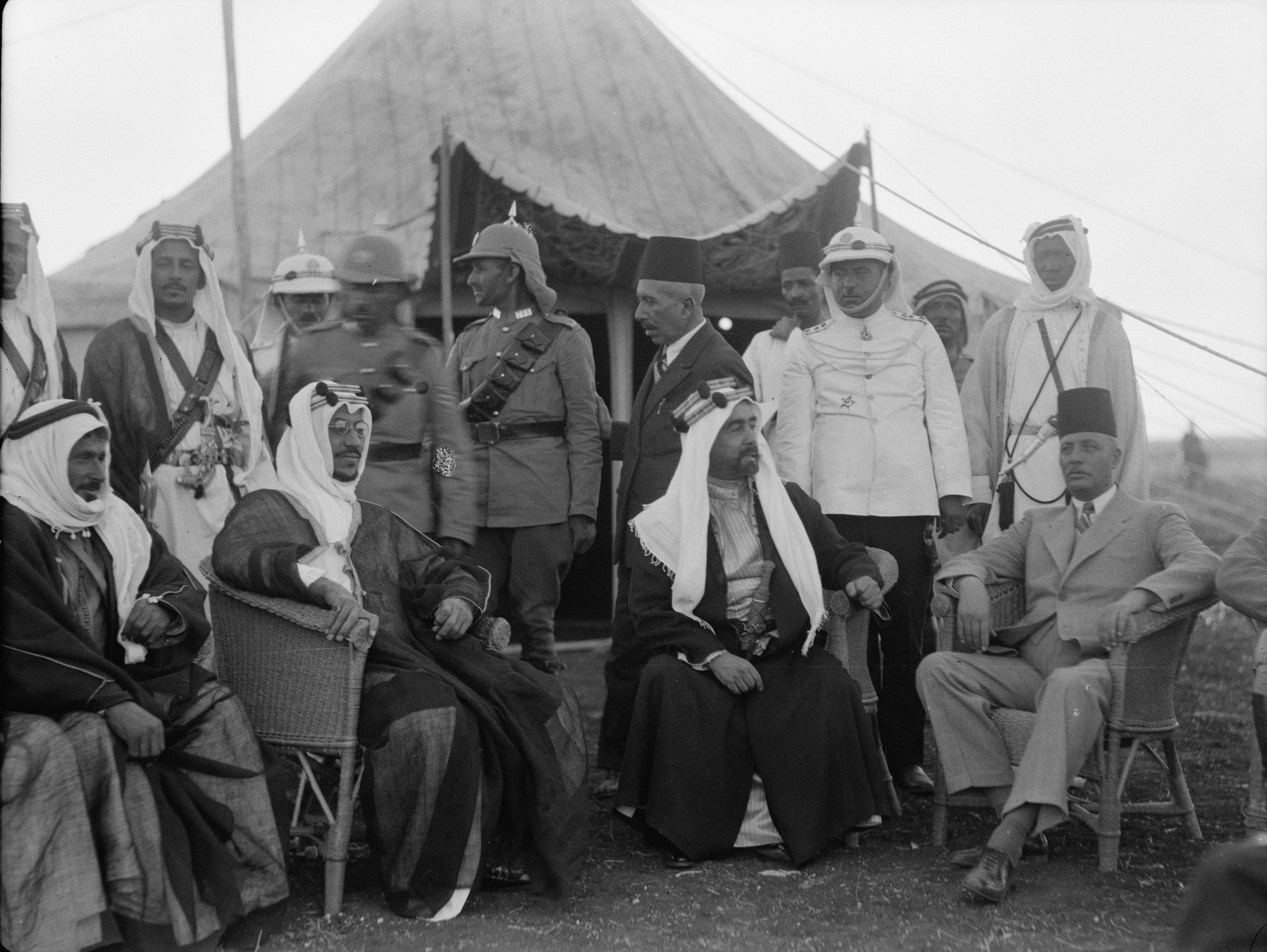
From right to left, Ibrahim Hashem, Abdullah I of Jordan, Saud of Saudi Arabia, and Mithqal Pasha Al-Fayez. 1934, Jordan.

At only 34 years of age, Hashem was appointed to the position of "Judicial Adviser" (Minister of Justice) during the first government of Rida al-Rikabi. When Abdullah and Rikabi departed to London for mandate negotiations on 3 October 1922, Shakir bin Zayd was appointed the acting prime minister, with Hashem as his assistant. A favourite of Emir Abdullah, Hashem was regularly sought out and selected for the Minister of Justice portfolio in the 1920s and 1930s. Between 1922 and 1938, he held this position 5 times, spanning no less than 12 years. In 1933, he was appointed the Prime Minister of Jordan, a position which he held until 1938. Hashem was appointed honorary Commander of the British Empire in the 1938 New Year Honours List.

== Independence Era and Member of the Throne Council ==
Hashem oversaw negotiations for a new Anglo-Jordanian treaty, and was the inaugural prime minister when independence was declared on 25 May 1946. Following the Arab-Israeli War and the Jordanian annexation of the West Bank, Abdullah was assassinated in 1951. The tenure of his son, Talal I as king was short-lived, owing to a mental illness. At the time, his successor, Hussein bin Talal had not attained his majority of 18 years and was unable to accede to the throne. Then President of the Senate, Hashem was appointed a member of a three-man interim Throne Council which acted for the absent sovereign. This was dissolved when Hussein acceded to the throne in 1953.

== Baghdad Pact, seventeen-day government, and constitutional crisis ==
In 1955, Turkey, Iraq, Iran and Pakistan joined the United Kingdom in forming the Middle East Treaty Organization (METO), a military alliance, popularly known as the Baghdad Pact. Much like Syrians and Egyptians, populations in the West Bank and East Bank (i.e. within Jordan) were strongly opposed to this treaty owing to its colonial overtones. A decree disallowing an opposition meeting in early January was met with violent demonstrations throughout Amman. The army was called in and a curfew was imposed.

Egged on by Cairo's "Sawt al-Arab" radio station, widespread demonstrations persisted throughout the country. This prompted King Hussein to dissolve the Chamber of Deputies on 19 December 1955. Constitutionally, a decree dissolving the Chamber required the signature of the king, the prime minister (then Hazza al-Majali), and the minister of interior. However, the decree was issued after the minister of interior, Abbas Mirza, had resigned. With a view to holding new elections, Hazza' al-Majali's government was asked to resign, and on 21 December 1955, Hashem was asked to form a government, and he only reluctantly accepted. Hashem sought diplomacy to root out the propaganda attacks emanating from Cairo. On 10 January, he sent a letter to Gamal Abdel Nasser, who had been opposed to the Baghdad pact, asking him to halt his radio campaign.

In spite of these arrangements, parliamentary delegates of the dissolved Chamber objected that the royal decree was unconstitutional, since it did not include the signature of the minister of the interior, as was required by the Jordanian Constitution. When the Supreme Council for the Interpretation of Law gave a ruling that the decree was unconstitutional, Hashem's government resigned. Hashem was appointed the deputy prime minister in Samir al-Rifa'i's subsequent government.

== Arab Federation and assassination ==
The impermanent Arab Federation, concocted to counter the United Arab Republic of Nasser and the Baathists, was negotiated and declared during Hashem's final term as prime minister between 1957 and 1958. After his resignation in May 1958, he was appointed the Federation's vice-president. Hashem had been visiting Baghdad when the 14 July Revolution flared up. Seen as royalist politicians, Ibrahim Hashem, along with Suleiman Toukan and Khulsi Al Khairi, respectively the Federation's ministers of defence and foreign affairs, were assassinated at the outset of the Revolution. The British Ambassador to Jordan claims that they were killed by a mob in front of the Iraqi Ministry of Defence. Other sources state that they were attacked by revolutionaries near the Baghdad airport.

== Other official positions ==
With few interruptions, Ibrahim Hashem was president of the Jordanian Senate between 1951 and 1956.

== Personal life ==
He was known to have a son named Qais, as well as daughters Salma (born 1914), Adma, Nelly (died young), Fatimah (died young), and Luli (born 1928) and other sons Hani, Abdullah, and Wai'l with his wife, Sabriya. Hashem's grandniece Hanan was the mother of Queen Alia of Jordan.

== National honours ==
  - Grand Cordon with Brilliants / Special First Class of the Supreme Order of the Renaissance
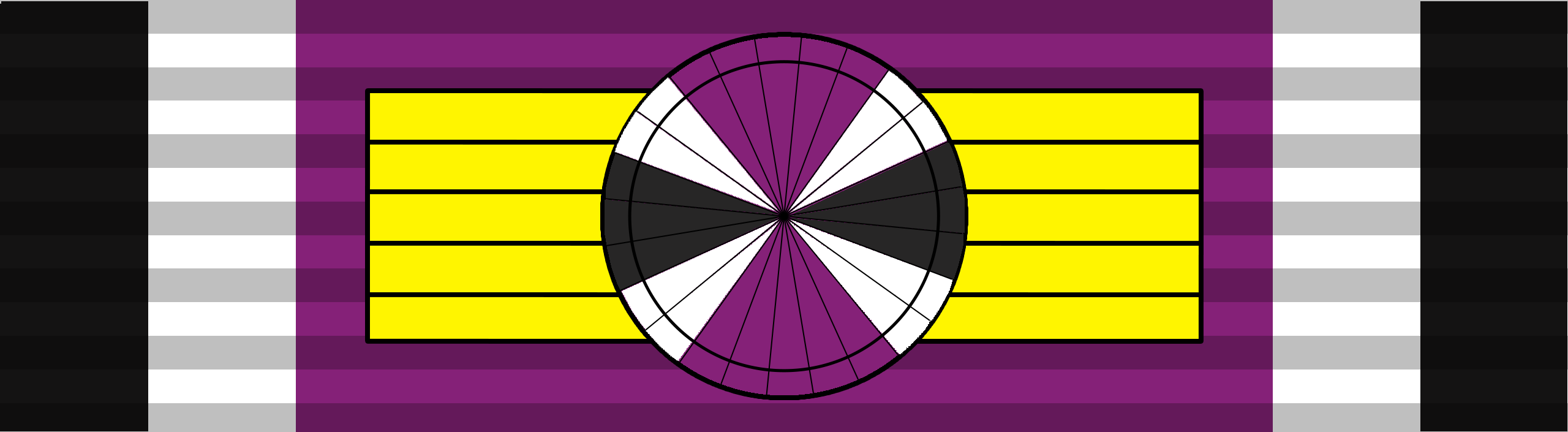
  - Grand Cordon / First Class of the Order of Independence (Jordan)

== Foreign honours ==
- Hashemite Kingdom of Iraq:
  - Grand Cordon / First Class of the Order of the Two Rivers
- Lebanon:
  - Extraordinary Grade of the Order of Merit
- Kingdom of Greece:
  - Grand Cross of the Order of the Phoenix (Greece)
- United Kingdom:
  - Honorary Commander of the Order of the British Empire

== See also ==
- List of prime ministers of Jordan
- Honorary Knight Commander

Political offices
Preceded by Samir al-Rifai	Prime Minister of Jordan; 1946 – 1947	Succeeded by Samir al-Rifai
Preceded by Hazza' al-Majali	Prime Minister of Jordan; 1955 – 1956	Succeeded by Samir al-Rifai
Preceded by Sa`id al-Mufti	Prime Minister of Jordan; 1956	Succeeded by Sulayman al-Nabulsi
