= Fayez Tarawneh =

Jordanian politician (1949–2021)

Fayez Tarawneh فايز الطراونة
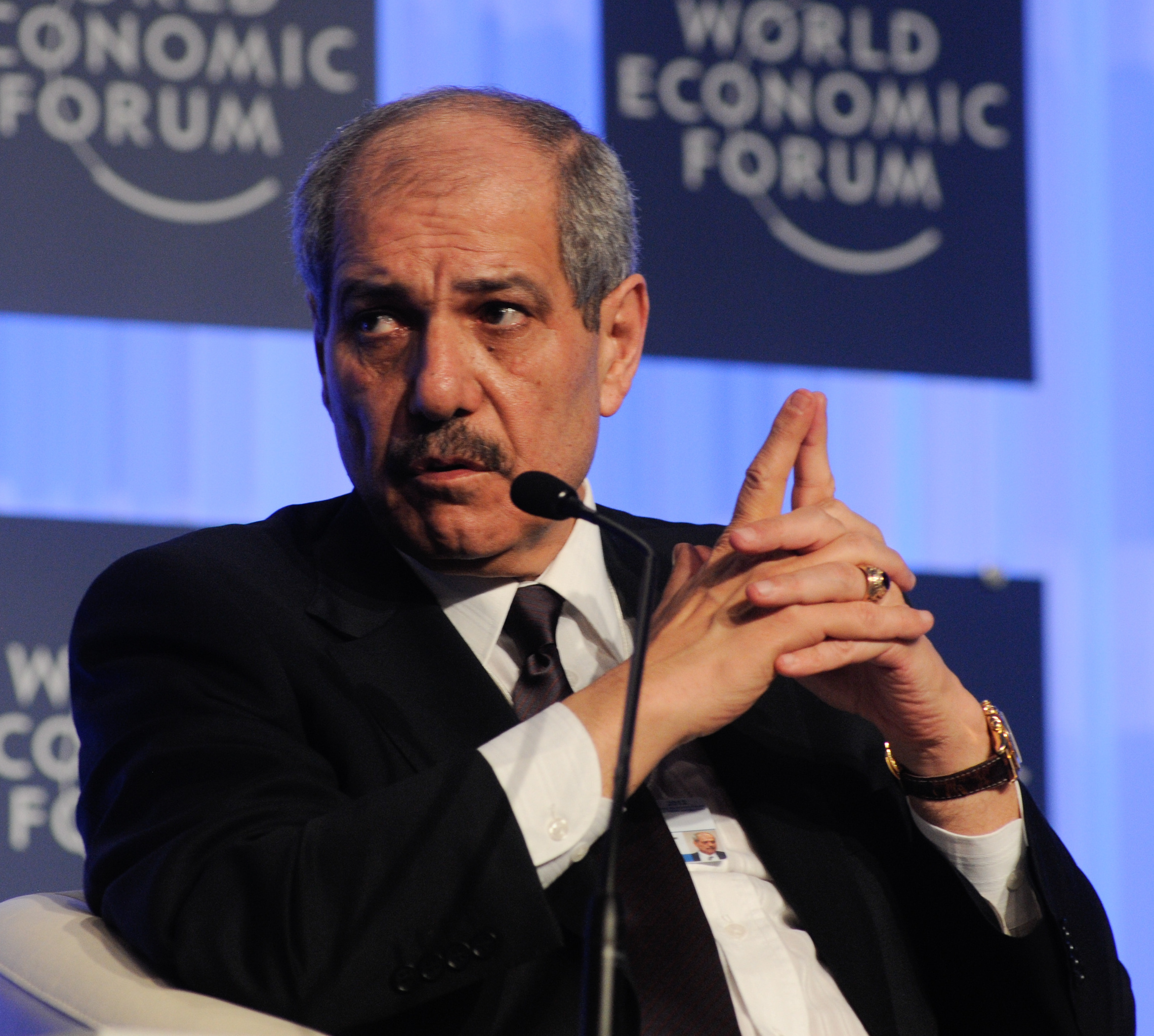
- Tarawneh at the World Economic Forum on MENA and Eurasia (2012)

Prime Minister of Jordan
- In office 2 May 2012 – 11 October 2012
- Monarch: Abdullah II
- Preceded by: Awn Shawkat Al-Khasawneh
- Succeeded by: Abdullah Ensour
- In office 20 August 1998 – 4 March 1999
- Monarchs: Hussein I Hassan (Regent); Abdullah II
- Preceded by: Abdelsalam al-Majali
- Succeeded by: Abdelraouf al-Rawabdeh

Personal details
- Born: 1 May 1949 Amman, Jordan
- Died: 15 December 2021 (aged 72) Amman, Jordan
- Party: Independent
- Education: University of Jordan; University of Southern California

Fayez Tarawneh (Arabic: فايز الطراونة; Fāyiz aṭ-Ṭarāwinah; 1 May 1949 – 15 December 2021) was a Jordanian independent politician, who served twice as the 31st Prime Minister of Jordan, and also as Chief of the Royal Hashemite Court.

== Early life and education ==
Tarawneh was born on 1 May 1949 in Amman, Jordan. He received a bachelor's degree in economy from the University of Jordan. He also obtained a master's degree in 1974 and a PhD in 1980 in economics, both from the University of Southern California.

== Career ==
Tarawneh was Jordanian ambassador to the United States from 1993 until 1997, (also accredited to Mexico as non-resident) and headed the Jordanian delegation that was in charge of peace negotiations with Israel in 1994. Then he was appointed prime minister and served in this post from 20 August 1998 to 4 March 1999, the last prime minister under King Hussein, who died in February 1999. Next he was named chief of the royal court in 1999. The other cabinet posts he held include Foreign Minister and Trade Minister. Tarawneh was appointed senator in 2003.

He was appointed to serve as prime minister for a second time on 26 April 2012 after the sudden resignation of his predecessor, Awn Shawkat Al-Khasawneh. An increase in fuel prices resulted in protests. On 2 September 2012, a motion of no confidence passed in parliament against his government. On 11 October 2012, he was replaced by Abdullah Ensour as prime minister. Tarawneh was appointed chief of royal court by King Abdullah II on 28 January 2013, replacing Riyad Abu Karaki.

== Death ==
Tarawneh died on 15 December 2021, at the age of 72 in Amman, Jordan. The following day, after the funeral prayer at the Royal Guards Mosque, he was buried at the Royal Cemetery in Amman in a funeral attended by King Abdullah, Prince Faisal and other senior Jordanian officials.

== Awards and recognition ==
In 1995, Tarawneh was awarded the Gabriel Peace Prize together with Israeli negotiator Elyakim Rubinstein for his role in the talks that led to the signing of the Israel-Jordan peace treaty in October 1994.

== See also ==
- Fayez al-Tarawneh's second cabinet

Political offices
Preceded by Abdelsalam al-Majali	Prime Minister of Jordan; 1998–1999	Succeeded by Abdelraouf al-Rawabdeh
Preceded by Awn Shawkat Al-Khasawneh	Prime Minister of Jordan; 2012	Succeeded by Abdullah Ensour
