= Mazhar Raslan =

Jordanian politician

- مظهر رسلان
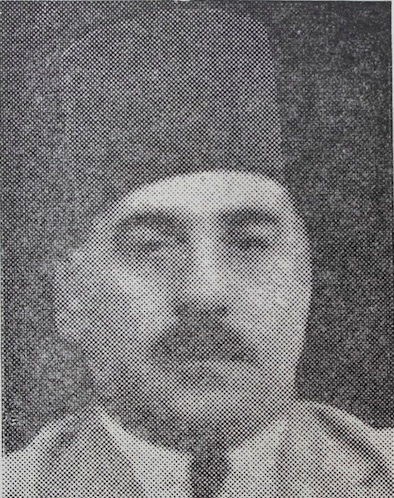

2nd Prime Minister of Transjordan
- In office 15 August 1921 – 10 March 1922
- Monarch: Abdullah I
- Preceded by: Rashid Tali’a
- Succeeded by: Ali Rikabi

Minister of Defence of Syria
- In office 23 February 1939 – 5 April 1939
- President: Hashim al-Atassi
- Preceded by: Jamil Mardam Bey
- Succeeded by: Nasuhi al-Bukhari

Personal details
- Born: 1886 Aleppo, Ottoman Empire
- Died: 28 May 1948 (aged 61–62) Cairo, Egypt

Mazhar Raslan (Arabic: مظهر رسلان; 1886 – 28 May 1948) was a Jordanian and Syrian politician who served as the 2nd prime minister from 1921 to 1922, and in 1923. He was Minster of Justice and Education in Prime Minister Haqqi al-Azm's government and Minister of Public Works and Supply in Prime Minister Saadallah al-Jabiri's government.

== Early life ==
Mazhar Raslan was born in Homs, in 1887. He graduated from the Mülkiye and held multiple provincial bureaucratic jobs in the Ottoman Empire.

== Career ==
Raslan started working for King Faisal I after World War I and was appointed mutasarrif of As-Salt. Raslan was a delegate to the Syrian National Congress in 1919. He formed an Arab government in Salt and Amman after Faisal was overthrown in 1920. He became an adviser to King Abdullah I of Jordan and served as prime minister from August 1921 to March 1922, and February to September 1923.

Raslan left for the Syrian Federation in May 1924. He was imprisoned at Arwad until 1928 due to his participation in the Arab Revolt.

Raslan joined the National Bloc in 1928. He was elected to the Constituent Assembly in 1928 and the Chamber of Deputies in 1932, 1936, and 1943. He represented Homs in the chamber.

Prime Minister Haqqi al-Azm selected Raslan to serve as Minister of Justice and Education in his government in 1932. He resigned from the government on 20 April 1933 due to his and the National Bloc's opposition to the proposed Franco-Syrian Treaty of Independence. They opposed the division of the Syrian land while the French wanted to give autonomous areas for the Druze and Alawites.

Raslan served as governor of the Latakia Governorate before being replaced by Ihsan Al Jabri.

Prime Minister Saadallah al-Jabiri appointed Raslan as Minister of Public Works and Supply.

== Personal life ==
Raslan was a Sunni Muslim. He was one of the large landowners of Homs.

== Works cited ==
=== Books ===
- Khoury, Philip (2014). Syria and the French Mandate: The Politics of Arab Nationalism, 1920-1945. Princeton University Press. ISBN 9781400858392.

=== Journals ===
- Moubayed, Sami (2014). "Syria's Forgotten First President Mohammad Ali al-Abed". British Journal of Middle Eastern Studies. 41 (4). Taylor & Francis: 419–441. doi:10.2307/43917078. JSTOR 43917078.

Political offices
Preceded by Rashid Tali’a	Prime Minister of Jordan; 1956–1957	Succeeded by Ali Rikabi
