= Fawzi Mulki =

Jordanian diplomat and politician (1910-1962)

Fawzi Mulki Pasha
- فوزي الملقي
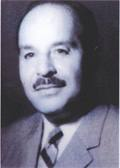

10th Prime Minister of Jordan
- In office 5 May 1953 – 2 May 1954
- Monarch: Hussein
- Preceded by: Tawfik Abu al-Huda
- Succeeded by: Tawfik Abu al-Huda

Jordanian Ambassador to France
- In office March 13, 1951 – November 27, 1951
- Preceded by: Hussein Nacer
- Succeeded by: Vincent Auriol

Jordanian Ambassador to the United Kingdom
- In office November 1951 – 5 May 1953
- Succeeded by: Sulayman al-Nabulsi

Jordanian Ambassador to Egypt
- In office 1947–1947
- Preceded by: Awni Abd al-Hadi
- Succeeded by: Baha Toukan

Personal details
- Born: 1910 Irbid, Ottoman Empire
- Died: 1962 (aged 51–52)
- Children: Hani Al-Mulki
- Education: American University of Beirut; University of Edinburgh

Fawzi Al-Mulki (1910–1962; Arabic: فوزي الملقي) was a Jordanian diplomat and politician. While serving as ambassador to the United Kingdom in the early 1950s, he befriended King Hussein, who was studying there.

In 1953 Hussein appointed al-Mulki to be the 10th Prime Minister of Jordan. He was dismissed in 1954 after his liberal policies caused riots throughout the country.

== Early life ==
Born in 1910 in Irbid, Mulki belonged to a family that originated in Hama, Syria.

== Career ==
- In 1934 he was employed at the Education Department (now ministry of Education).
- From 1940 to 1947 he was Deputy Food controller, later Economic Adviser to the Government.
- In 1947 he was successively Consul-General in Cairo and Jordan Minister to Egypt and Minister of Foreign Affairs of Jordan.
- During the 1948 Palestine war he was Minister of Defense in the cabinet of Tawfik Abu al-Huda (28 December 1947 – 12 April 1950).
- In 1951 he was Minister in Paris (France).
- From November 1951 to 1953 he was Minister/ambassador in London (Great Britain) while Hussein of Jordan was educated.
- From 5 May 1953 to 2 May 1954 he was Prime Minister of Jordan.
- In a cabinet of 1956 he was Minister of Foreign Affairs and Education.

Political offices
Preceded by Tawfik Abu al-Huda	Prime Minister of Jordan; 1953–1954	Succeeded by Tawfik Abu al-Huda
