= Bahjat Talhouni =

Prime Minister of Jordan (1913–1994)

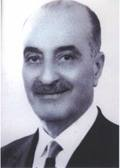
- Prime Minister Bahjat Talhouni

Prime Minister of Jordan
- In office 29 August 1960 – 28 January 1962
- Monarch: Hussein
- Preceded by: Hazza' al-Majali
- Succeeded by: Wasfi al-Tal
- In office 6 July 1964 – 14 February 1965
- Monarch: Hussein
- Preceded by: Hussein ibn Nasser
- Succeeded by: Wasfi al-Tal
- In office 7 October 1967 – 24 March 1969
- Monarch: Hussein
- Preceded by: Saad Jumaa
- Succeeded by: Abdelmunim al-Rifai
- In office 13 August 1969 – 27 June 1970
- Monarch: Hussein
- Preceded by: Abdelmunim al-Rifai
- Succeeded by: Abdelmunim al-Rifai

Personal details
- Born: 1913 Ma'an, Ottoman Empire
- Died: 30 January 1994 (aged 80–81) Amman, Jordan
- Spouse: Zahra Mradi (1922–2012)
- Children: Adnan, Ghassan, Mona
- Profession: Law

Bahjat Talhouni (Arabic: بهجت التلهوني; 1913 – January 30, 1994) was a Jordanian political figure. He served as the 14th Prime Minister of Jordan between 1960 and 1970 for six different terms.

Talhouni was Prime Minister from August 1969 to June 1970, during a particularly turbulent time of friction and skirmishes between the Government and thousands of Palestinian guerrillas who were then in Jordan.

The Palestinian guerrillas, members of various organizations, frequently disregarded Jordanian laws and came to be almost a state within a state.

In February 1970, King Hussein of Jordan met with their leaders at Talhouni's house in Amman. At that meeting the King agreed not to enforce restrictions on the Palestinians carrying firearms in Jordanian towns, and the leaders of the guerrillas promised to try to make their followers less unruly.

A strained and often interrupted truce ensued. Then came an unsuccessful attempt on the King's life in June.

Angered, the Jordanian Army called loudly for a crackdown on the Palestinians. But as a biographer of the King, Peter Snow, wrote in 1972, "Talhouni wavered; like Hussein, he was not eager to be responsible for the order that could lead to wide-scale bloodshed."

Late in June 1970, the King replaced Talhouni with a new Prime Minister, Abdel Moneim Rifai, a champion of reconciliation with the Palestinians.

But skirmishes between the Army, which stayed loyal to the King, and the Palestinians escalated into civil war in September 1970. The King let the Army crush the fighters, and by the following summer they had been nullified as a military force in Jordan.

In addition to serving as Prime Minister, over the years Talhouni held the posts of Minister of the Interior and of Justice, chief of the Royal Court, and served as a legislator and personal representative of the King.

He was born in Ma'an, in what is now southern Jordan, and studied law in Syria. He served as president of the Court of Appeals in Amman before becoming Minister of the Interior in 1953.

He served as the President of the Senate of Jordan from December 1974 to January 1983.

Talhouni died on January 30, 1994, as announced by the Jordanian Government announced. He was 81.

== See also ==
- List of prime ministers of Jordan

Political offices
Preceded by Hazza' al-Majali	Prime Minister of Jordan; 1960–1962	Succeeded by Wasfi al-Tal
Preceded by Hussein ibn Nasser	Prime Minister of Jordan; 1964–1965	Succeeded by Wasfi al-Tal
Preceded by Saad Jumaa	Prime Minister of Jordan; 1967–1969	Succeeded by Abdelmunim al-Rifai
Preceded by Abdelmunim al-Rifai	Prime Minister of Jordan; 1969–1970	Succeeded by Abdelmunim al-Rifai
