= Samir Al-Rifai =

Jordanian politician (1901–1965)

Samir al-Rifai سمير الرفاعي
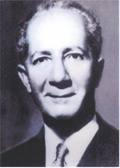

8th Prime Minister of Jordan
- In office 27 March 1963 – 21 April 1963
- Monarch: Hussein
- Preceded by: Wasfi al-Tal
- Succeeded by: Hussein ibn Nasser
- In office 18 May 1958 – 6 May 1959
- Monarch: Hussein
- Preceded by: Ibrahim Hashem
- Succeeded by: Hazza' al-Majali
- In office 8 January 1956 – 22 May 1956
- Monarch: Hussein
- Preceded by: Ibrahim Hashem
- Succeeded by: Sa`id al-Mufti
- In office 4 December 1950 – 25 July 1951
- Monarchs: Talal; Abdullah I
- Preceded by: Sa`id al-Mufti
- Succeeded by: Tawfik Abu al-Huda
- In office 4 February 1947 – 28 December 1947
- Monarch: Abdullah I
- Preceded by: Ibrahim Hashem
- Succeeded by: Tawfik Abu al-Huda

Minister of Finance
- In office 1943–1944
- Prime Minister: Tawfik Abu Al-Huda
- Preceded by: Shukri Shashaa
- Succeeded by: Moussallam Al-Attar

Personal details
- Born: 30 January 1901 Safed, Beirut Vilayet, Ottoman Empire
- Died: 12 October 1965 (aged 64) Amman, Jordan
- Party: Independent
- Relatives: Al-Rifai family
- Education: American University of Beirut

Samir al-Rifai (Arabic: سمير الرفاعي; 30 January 1901 –12 October 1965) was a politician and statesman of Palestinian descent who served several terms as the 8th Prime Minister of Jordan.

== Biography ==
Samir al Rifai was born on 30 January 1901, his father Talib al Rifai was from Safed, while his mother Najla Bakkar was from Lebanon. He was the older brother of Abdelmunim al Rifai who also served as the 18th Prime Minister of Jordan.

Al-Rifai served under Kings Abdullah I, Talal and Hussein:

- Minister of Finance from 1943 to 1944
- Minister of Justice from 1943 to 1944
- Prime Minister of the Emirate of Transjordan from 15 October 1944 to 19 May 1945
- Prime Minister of the Emirate of Transjordan from 19 May 1945 to 25 May 1946
- Prime Minister of the Hashemite Kingdom of Jordan from 4 December 1950 to 25 July 1951
- Prime Minister of the Hashemite Kingdom of Jordan from 8 January 1956 to 22 May 1956
- Prime Minister of the Hashemite Kingdom of Jordan from 18 May 1958 to 6 May 1959
- Prime Minister of the Hashemite Kingdom of Jordan from 27 March 1963 to 21 April 1963
- President of the Senate of Jordan from 10 July 1963 to 1 November 1965

He was the father of Prime Minister Zaid al-Rifai and the grandfather of Prime Minister Samir Rifai, and the elder brother of Prime Minister Abdelmunim Rifai.

He died in Amman, aged 64.

== See also ==
- List of prime ministers of Jordan

Political offices
Preceded by Ibrahim Hashem	Prime Minister of Jordan; 1947	Succeeded by Tawfik Abu al-Huda
Preceded by Sa`id al-Mufti	Prime Minister of Jordan; 1950–1951	Succeeded by Tawfik Abu al-Huda
Preceded by Ibrahim Hashem	Prime Minister of Jordan; 1956	Succeeded by Sa`id al-Mufti
Preceded by Ibrahim Hashem	Prime Minister of Jordan; 1958–1959	Succeeded by Hazza' al-Majali
Preceded by Wasfi al-Tal	Prime Minister of Jordan; 1963	Succeeded by Hussein ibn Nasser
