= Tawfik Abu Al-Huda =

Prime minister of the Emirate of Transjordan

Tawfik Abu al-Huda
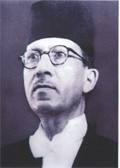

7th Prime Minister of Jordan
- In office 4 May 1954 – 30 May 1955
- Monarch: Hussein
- Preceded by: Fawzi al-Mulki
- Succeeded by: Sa`id al-Mufti
- In office 25 July 1951 – 5 May 1953
- Monarchs: Talal; Hussein
- Preceded by: Samir al-Rifai
- Succeeded by: Fawzi al-Mulki
- In office 28 December 1947 – 12 April 1950
- Monarch: Abdullah I
- Preceded by: Samir al-Rifai
- Succeeded by: Sa`id al-Mufti

Personal details
- Born: 1895 Akka, Ottoman Palestine
- Died: 1 July 1956 (aged 60–61) Amman, Jordan
- Party: Independent

Tawfik Abu al-Huda (Arabic: توفيق ابو الهدى) (also known as Tawfik Pasha Abul-Huda) (1895 – 1 July 1956) served several terms as the 7th prime minister of Jordan. First he served as prime minister of Transjordan from September 28, 1938, to October 15, 1944, and he served another term from December 28, 1947, to April 12, 1950. Between July 25, 1951, and May 5, 1953, and from May 4, 1954, to May 30, 1955, he served as Prime Minister of Jordan. During his last term as prime minister, he tried to consolidate the power of King Hussein by holding parliamentary elections which many accused of being fraudulent. His terms are notable for the 1948 Arab-Israeli War, during which Transjordan conquered the West Bank, and the forced abdication of King Talal.

He was Minister of Justice from 1938 to 1940. He served as the president of the Senate of Jordan from 1947 to 1951.

Tawfik Abu al-Huda was of Palestinian descent. He was married to the sister of the Ottoman banker in Amman.

== In office ==
Abu al-Huda formed 12 governments during his service as a prime minister which lasted beyond the entire era of World War II in the Middle East.

| × | Formation | Resignation | Monarch |
|---|---|---|---|
| 1 | 28 September 1938 | 6 August 1939 | King Abdullah I |
| 2 | 6 August 1939 | 24 September 1940 | King Abdullah I |
| 3 | 25 September 1940 | 27 July 1941 | King Abdullah I |
| 4 | 29 July 1941 | 18 May 1943 | King Abdullah I |
| 5 | 19 May 1943 | 14 October 1944 | King Abdullah I |
| 6 | 18 December 1947 | 3 May 1949 | King Abdullah I |
| 7 | 7 May 1949 | 12 April 1950 | King Abdullah I |
| 8 | 25 July 1951 | 7 September 1951 | King Talal |
| 9 | 8 September 1951 | 27 September 1952 | King Talal |
| 10 | 30 September 1952 | 5 May 1953 | King Hussein |
| 11 | 4 May 1954 | 21 October 1954 | King Hussein |
| 12 | 24 October 1954 | 28 May 1955 | King Hussein |

== Death ==
Tawfik Pasha was found dead, hanging in bathroom at his house in 1956 in an apparent suicide; he was said to have been suffering with cancer.

== See also ==
- List of prime ministers of Jordan

Political offices
| Preceded by Samir al-Rifai | Prime Minister of Jordan; 1947–1950 | Succeeded by Sa`id al-Mufti |
| Preceded by Samir al-Rifai | Prime Minister of Jordan; 1951–1953 | Succeeded by Fawzi Mulki |
| Preceded by Fawzi Mulki | Prime Minister of Jordan; 1954–1955 | Succeeded by Sa`id al-Mufti |
