= Sa'id Mufti =

Prime minister of Jordan

His Excellency Sa'id Mufti سعيد مفتي Хьэбжьокъуэ Сайд
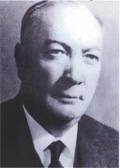

9th Prime Minister of Jordan
- In office 12 April 1950 – 4 December 1950
- Monarch: Abdullah I
- Preceded by: Tawfik Abu al-Huda
- Succeeded by: Samir al-Rifai
- In office 30 May 1955 – 15 December 1955
- Monarch: Hussein
- Preceded by: Tawfik Abu al-Huda
- Succeeded by: Hazza Al-Majali
- In office 22 May 1956 – 1 July 1956
- Monarch: Hussein
- Preceded by: Samir al-Rifai
- Succeeded by: Ibrahim Hashim

Minister of Finance
- In office 1945
- Monarch: Abdullah I of Jordan
- Preceded by: Moussallam Al-Attar
- Succeeded by: Mohammad al-Shoreki

Personal details
- Born: 26 June 1898 Amman, Ottoman Empire
- Died: 25 March 1989 (aged 90) Amman, Jordan
- Party: Independent
- Profession: Politician, diplomat

Sa'id Pasha al-Mufti (Arabic: سعيد المفتي; Adyghe: Хьэбжьокъуэ Сайд; 26 June 1898 – 25 March 1989) was a Jordanian politician and diplomat who served as the 9th Prime Minister of Jordan, a position he served three terms in between 14 April 1950 and 1 July 1956.

Al-Mufti lived in Jabal Amman, an affluent area in Jordan's capital of Amman; his house became known for its unique architecture and was later dubbed Al-Mufti House.

He was of Circassian origin and was an independent politician, serving in several terms as interior minister (1944–1945, 1948–1950, 1951–1953 and 1957). He was Minister of Finance in 1945, and served as the President of the Senate of Jordan from December 1956 to July 1963 and from November 1965 to November 1974.

A street in the Sweifieh area of Amman was named after him in his honor, where the Embassy of Bosnia and Herzegovina is located.

== Honour ==
=== Foreign honour ===
- Malaysia : Honorary Commander of the Order of the Defender of the Realm (1965)

Political offices
Preceded by Tawfik Abu al-Huda	Prime Minister of Jordan; 1950	Succeeded by Samir al-Rifai
Preceded by Tawfik Abu al-Huda	Prime Minister of Jordan; 1955	Succeeded by Hazza' al-Majali
Preceded by Samir al-Rifai	Prime Minister of Jordan; 1956	Succeeded by Ibrahim Hashem
