= Prime Minister of Jordan =

Head of government

Prime Minister of the Hashemite Kingdom of Jordan
- Coat of arms of Jordan

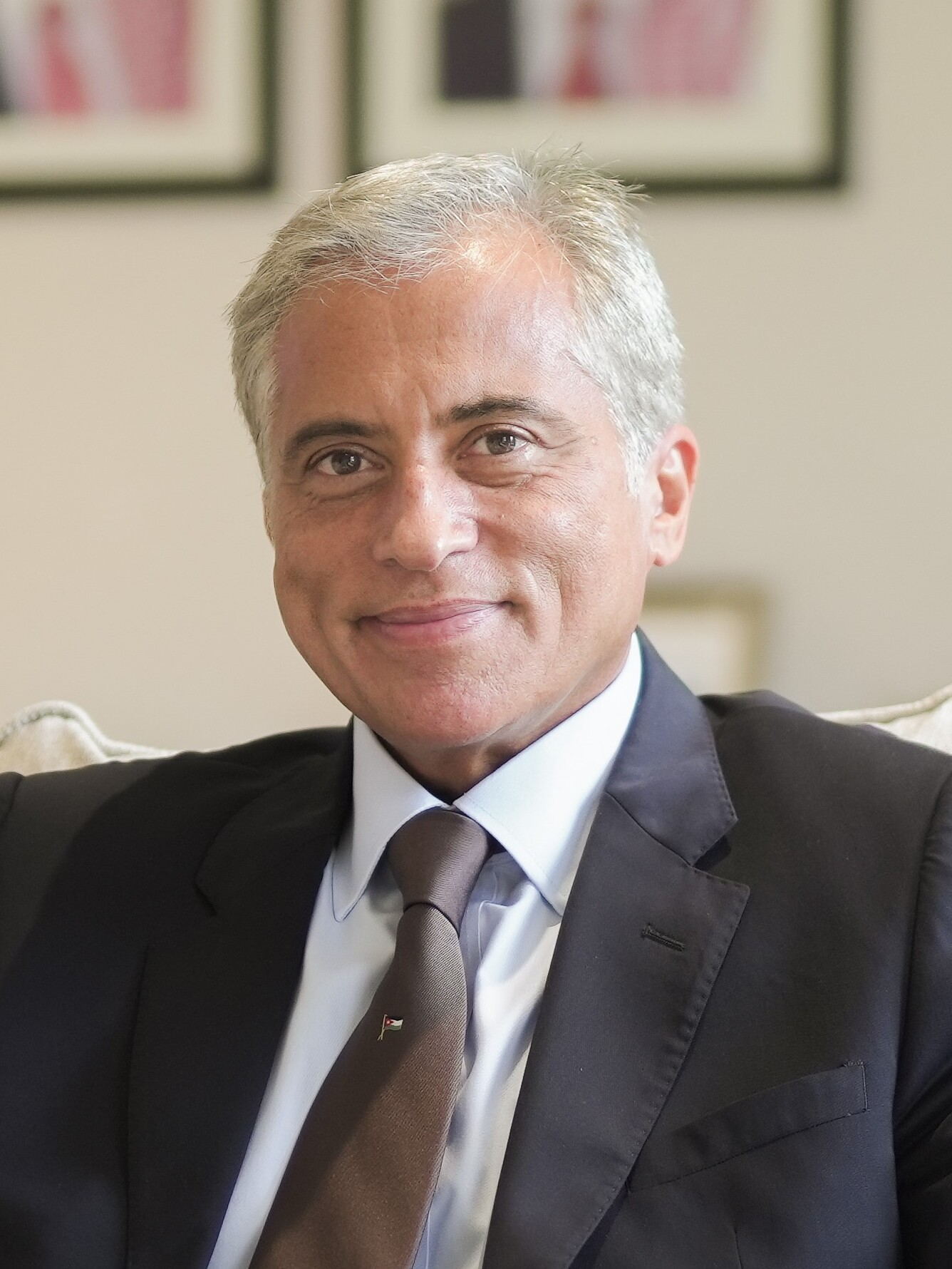
- Incumbent; Jafar Hassan since 15 September 2024
- Appointer: Abdullah II
- Inaugural holder: Ibrahim Hashem
- Formation: 25 May 1946; 80 years ago

The prime minister of Jordan is the head of government of the Hashemite Kingdom of Jordan.

The prime minister is appointed by the king of Jordan, who is then free to form his own Cabinet. The Parliament of Jordan then approves the programs of the new government through a vote of confidence. There are no constitutional limits on a prime minister's term, and several of them served multiple non-consecutive terms.

== Prime Ministry of Jordan ==
The Prime Ministry is the central agency of the Government of Jordan which acts as the secretariat to the Prime Minister.

== See also ==
- Politics of Jordan
