= List of University of London people =

The following people spent time at the University of London as either teaching staff or students. In 2015 there were a total of around 2 million University of London alumni across the world.

Until year 2008, all colleges within the federal collegiate system, solely awarded a University of London degree. From 2003 onwards some colleges received their own degree-awarding powers. However, these were held in abeyance until 2008, when a number of colleges began to award their own degrees.

| BBK | Birkbeck |
| BRUN | Brunel University of London (joined 2024) |
| CSSD | Royal Central School of Speech and Drama |
| CITY | City St George's, University of London (merger of City and St George's in 2024) |
| CIA | Courtauld Institute of Art |
| GCUL | Goldsmiths, University of London |
| HEY | Heythrop College, University of London (closed 2018) |
| ICL | Imperial College London (left UOL in 2007) |
| ICR | Institute of Cancer Research |
| IOL | Institute of Education (merged with UCL in 2014) |
| KCL | King's College London |
| LI | Lister Institute for Preventive Medicine |
| LBS | London Business School |
| LSE | London School of Economics |
| LSHTM | London School of Hygiene & Tropical Medicine |
| QMUL | Queen Mary University of London |
| RAM | Royal Academy of Music |
| RHUL | Royal Holloway, University of London |
| RVC | Royal Veterinary College |
| SAS | School of Advanced Study |
| SGUL | St George's, University of London (merged into City St George's in 2024) |
| SOAS | School of Oriental and African Studies |
| UCL | University College London |
| UOL | University of London Worldwide |
| ULP | University of London Institute in Paris |
| Hon. | Honorary degree |

== Nobel laureates ==
There are a total of 84 Nobel laureates who were either students or staff members at the University of London. Their respective college or colleges is shown in parentheses. The following table shows the number of Nobel laureates from each college:

| University College London | 29 |
| London School of Economics | 18 |
| Imperial College London (left UOL as on 2007) | 14 |
| King's College London | 12 |
| Queen Mary University of London | 9 |
| University of London International Programmes | 7 |
| Birkbeck, University of London | 5 |
| Lister Institute for Preventive Medicine | 3 |
| London School of Hygiene & Tropical Medicine | 2 |
| Central School of Speech and Drama | 1 |
| School of Oriental and African Studies | 1 |

There are also many non-formal graduates of the University of London who have been awarded honorary degrees and doctorates to Nobel Laureates. Notable names include Amartya Sen (Hon. DSc), Shirin Ebadi (Hon. LLD), George Akerlof (Hon. DSc), Robert Mundell (Hon. DSc), Muhammad Yunus (Hon. DSc)

== Politicians ==
=== Presidents and prime ministers ===
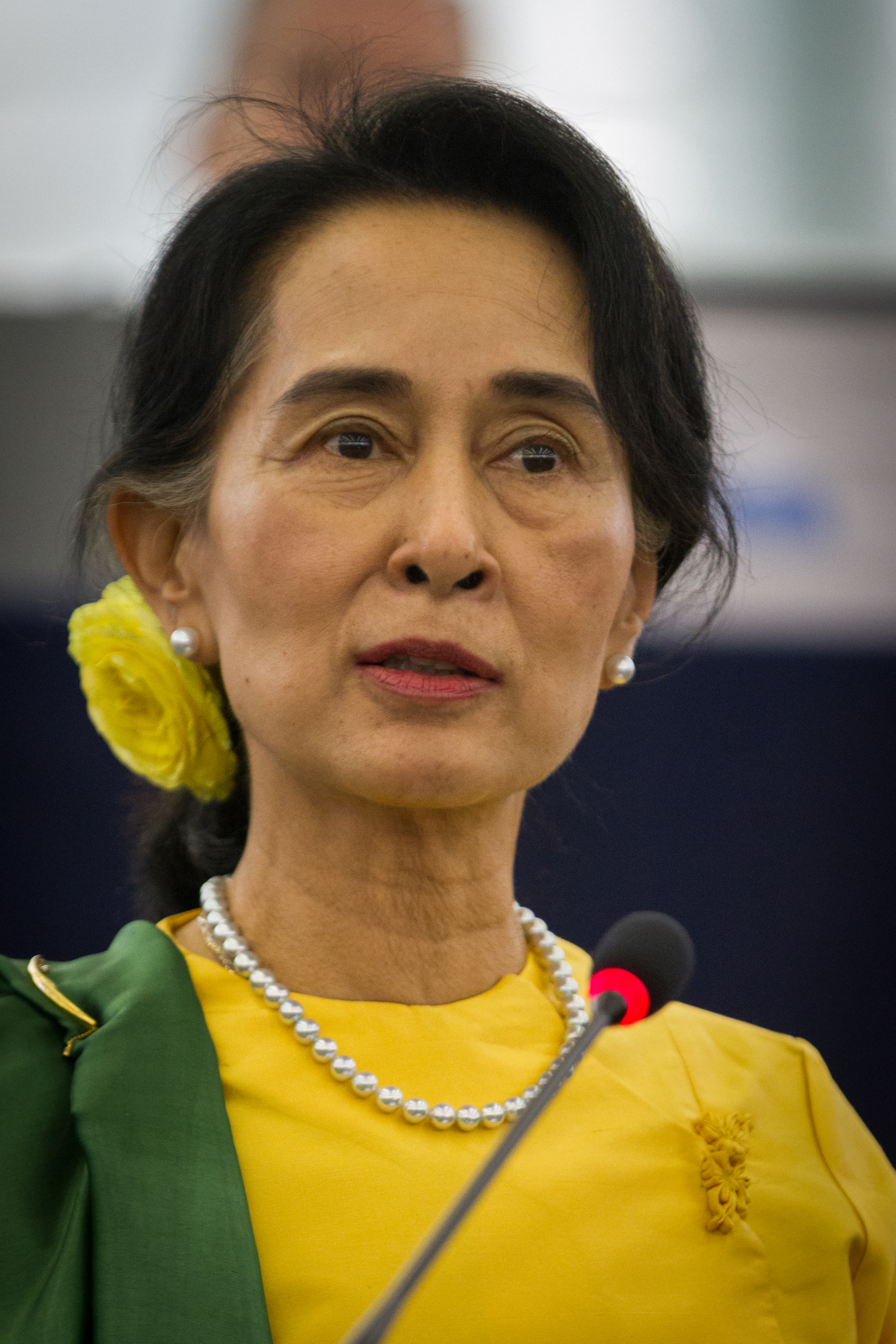
Aung San Suu Kyi, 1st State Counsellor of Myanmar

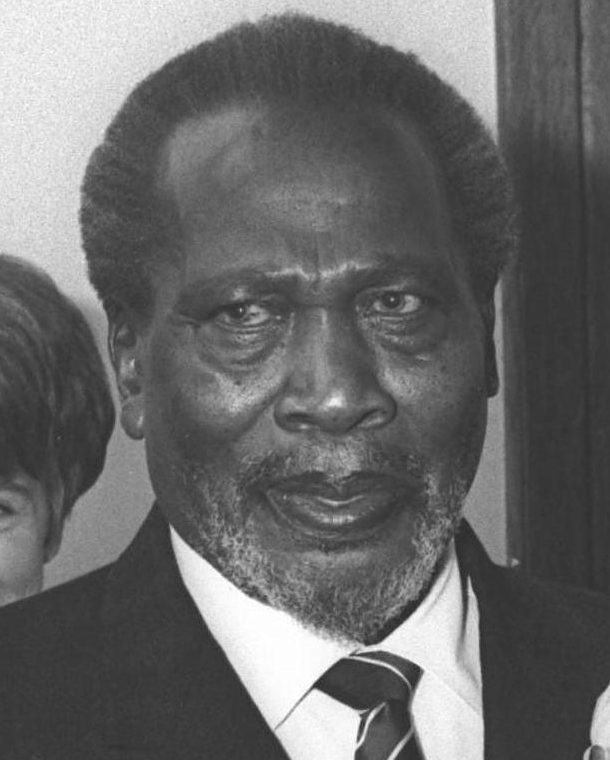
Jomo Kenyatta, president of Kenya (1964–1978)

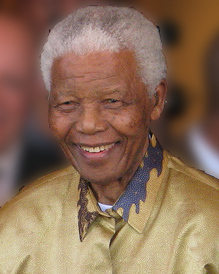
Nelson Mandela, first president of South Africa

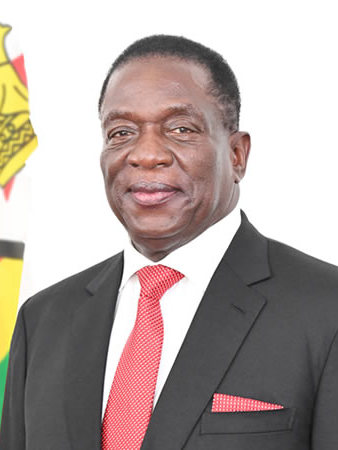
Emmerson Mnangagwa, 3rd president of Zimbabwe

- Aung San Suu Kyi – incumbent State Counsellor of Myanmar (SOAS)
- Tarō Asō – former prime minister of Japan (2008–2009); deputy prime minister and Minister of Finance (2012–2021)
- Clement Attlee – prime minister of the United Kingdom (CITY)
- H. H. Asquith – prime minister of the United Kingdom (CITY)
- Hossein Ala' – prime minister of Iran
- Harmodio Arias – president of Panama, 1932–1936 (LSE)
- Óscar Arias – president of Costa Rica, 1986–1990, 2006–present (LSE)
- Marouf al-Bakhit – prime minister of Jordan, 2005–2007 (KCL)
- Errol Walton Barrow – prime minister of Barbados, 1962–1966, 1966–1976, 1986–1987 (LSE)
- Sükhbaataryn Batbold – prime minister of Mongolia, 2009–present (LBS)
- Abd ar-Rahman al-Bazzaz – prime minister of Iraq, 1965–1966 (KCL)
- Marek Belka – prime minister of Poland, 2004–2005 (LSE)
- Godfrey Binaisa – president of Uganda, 1979–1980 (KCL)
- Tony Blair – prime minister of the United Kingdom (CITY)
- Heinrich Brüning – chancellor of Germany, 1930–1932 (LSE)
- Kim Campbell – prime minister of Canada, June–November 1993 (LSE)
- Eugenia Charles – prime minister of Dominica, 1980–1995 (LSE)
- Ellis Clarke – prime minister of Trinidad and Tobago, 1976–1987 (UCL)
- John Compton – premier of Saint Lucia, 1964–1979, and prime minister of Saint Lucia, February–July 1979 & 1982–1996 (LSE)
- Geraint Davies – assembly member (AM) for Rhondda, 1999–2003, (Chelsea College of Science and Technology)
- Sher Bahadur Deuba – prime minister of Nepal, 1995–1997, 2001–2002, 2004–2005 (LSE)
- Luisa Diogo – prime minister of Mozambique, 1991–1992 (SOAS)
- Bülent Ecevit – former prime minister of Turkey (SOAS)
- Robert Fico – current prime minister of Slovakia (UCL)
- Rajiv Gandhi – prime minister of India 1984–1989 (ICL)
- Natalia Gherman – acting prime minister of Moldova, 2015 (KCL)
- Chaim Herzog – president of Israel 1983–1993 (UCL)
- Htin Kyaw – 9th and incumbent president of Myanmar (ICS)
- Hirobumi Ito – prime minister of Japan, 1885–1888, 1892–1896, 1898, 1900–1901 (UCL)
- Guðni Th. Jóhannesson – Icelandic politician; president of Iceland (2016–) (QMUL)
- Jomo Kenyatta – first president of Kenya, 1964–1978 (LSE)
- Mwai Kibaki – president of Kenya, 2002–present (LSE)
- Glafcos Klerides – president of Cyprus, 1993–2003 (KCL)
- Junichiro Koizumi – prime minister of Japan, 2001–2006 (UCL)
- Thanin Kraivichien – prime minister of Thailand, 1976–1977 (LSE)
- Yu Kuo-Hwa – premier of Taiwan, 1984–1989 (LSE)
- Hilla Limann – president of Ghana, 1979–1981 (LSE)
- Alfonso López Pumarejo – president of Colombia, 1934–1938, 1942–1945 (LSE)
- Ramsay MacDonald – prime minister of the United Kingdom 1924, 1929–1935 (BBK)
- Nelson Mandela – president of South Africa (UOL)
- Michael Manley – prime minister of Jamaica, 1972–1980, 1989–1992 (LSE)
- Kamisese Mara – prime minister of Fiji 1970–1992, President of Fiji 1994–2000 (LSE)
- Ahmed Mohamed Mohamoud – president of Somaliland (LSE)
- Sir Lee Moore – prime minister of Saint Kitts and Nevis, 1979–1980 (KCL)
- Robert Mugabe – president of Zimbabwe (UOL)
- Emmerson Mnangagwa – president of Zimbabwe (UOL)
- Kocheril Raman Narayanan – president of India, 1997–2002 (LSE)
- Kwame Nkrumah – president of Ghana, 1960–1966 (LSE)
- Basdeo Panday – prime minister of Trinidad and Tobago, 1995–2001
- Tassos Papadopoulos – president of Cyprus, 2003–2008 (KCL)
- Percival Patterson – prime minister of Jamaica, 1992–2006 (LSE)
- Sir Lynden Pindling – prime minister of the Bahamas, 1969–1992 (KCL)
- Romano Prodi – prime minister of Italy, 1996–1998, 2006–2008, President of the European Commission, 1999–2004 (LSE)
- Navinchandra Ramgoolam – prime minister of Mauritius, 1995–2000 (LSE)
- France-Albert René – prime minister of Seychelles 1976–1977, and president of Seychelles 1977–2004 (KCL)
- Sir Veerasamy Ringadoo – first president of Mauritius, March–June 1992 (LSE)
- A.N.R. Robinson – prime minister of Trinidad and Tobago, 1986–1981, and President of Trinidad and Tobago, 1997–2003
- Moshe Sharett – prime minister of Israel, 1953–1955 (LSE)
- Constantine Simitis – prime minister of Greece, 1996–2004 (LSE)
- Margaret Thatcher – prime minister of the United Kingdom (CITY)
- Anote Tong – president of Kiribati, 2003–present (LSE)
- Pierre Trudeau – prime minister of Canada, 1968–1979, 1980–1984 (LSE)

=== Other prominent political figures ===
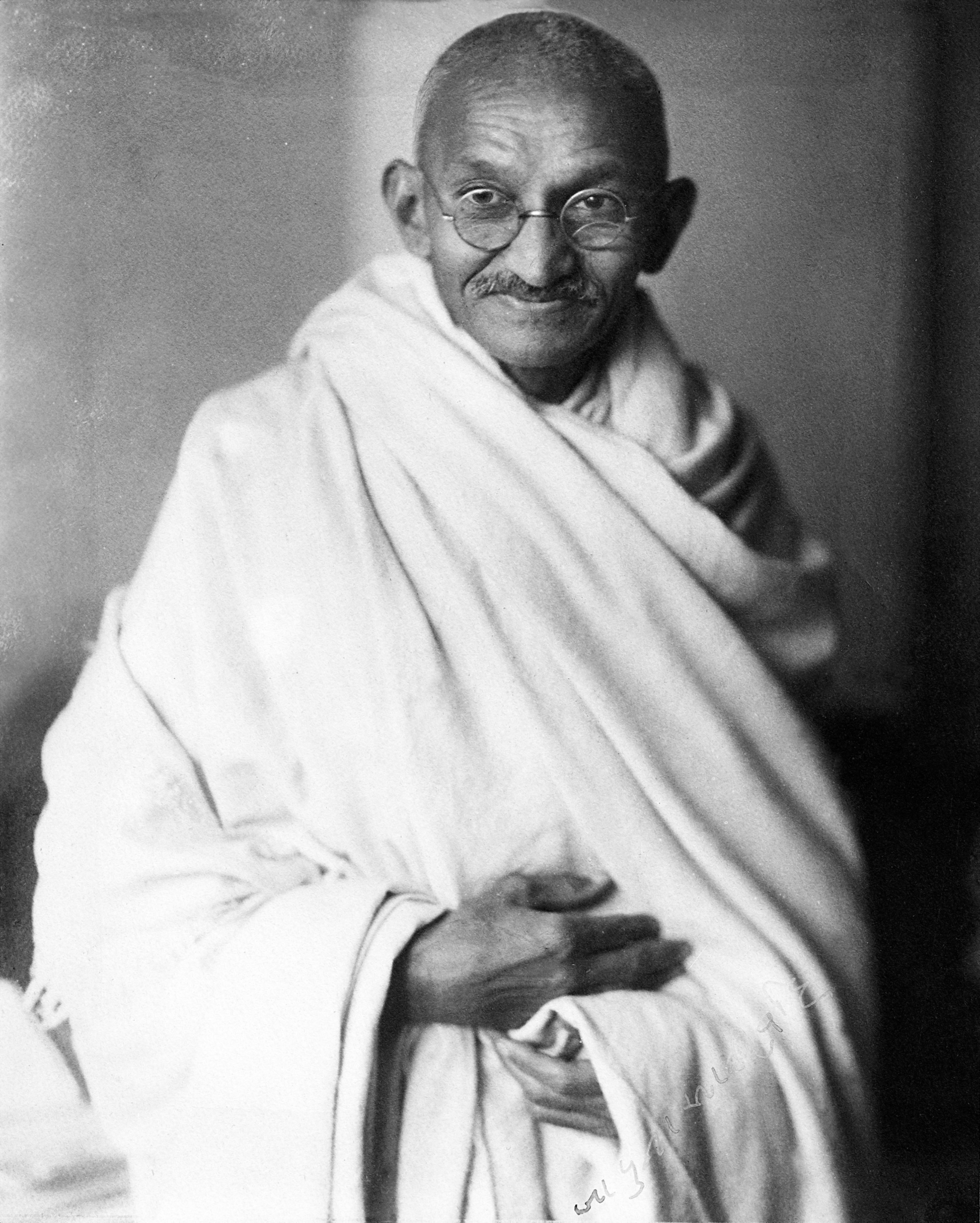
Mahatma Gandhi, Father of the Nation for India

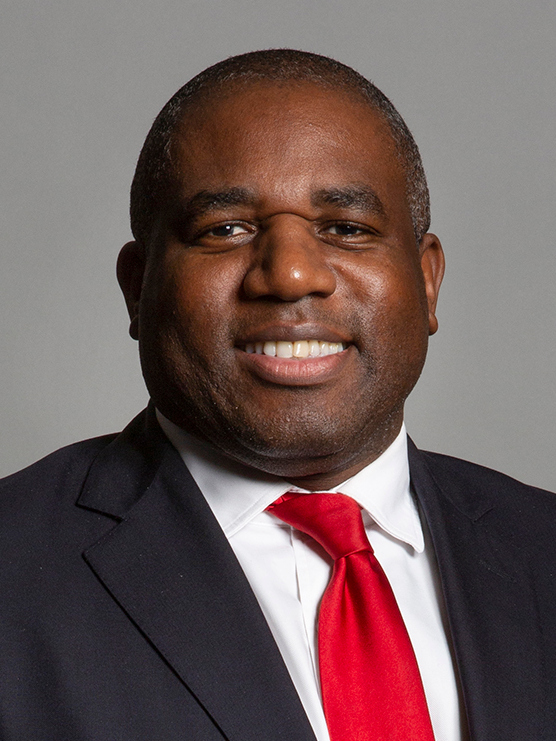
David Lammy, Foreign Secretary of the United Kingdom

- Yusuf Hassan Abdi – Kenyan politician
- Christopher Addison, 1st Viscount Addison – British minister (QMUL)
- B. R. Ambedkar – architect of the Indian Constitution, Indian independence leader, minister and anti-caste system activist (LSE)
- Obed Asamoah – Ghanaian Foreign Minister (KCL)
- Kemi Badenoch – Leader of the Opposition and Former Secretary of State for Business and Trade (BBK)
- Ziad Bahaa-Eldin – deputy prime minister of Egypt (KCL)
- Pengiran Bahrin – Attorney General of Brunei
- Martin Bourke – governor of the Turks and Caicos Islands (KCL)
- Ed Broadbent – Canadian political leader (LSE)
- Dame Lois Browne-Evans – Bermudian opposition leader (KCL)
- Rudranath Capildeo – Leader of the Opposition of the Commonwealth of Trinidad and Tobago
- Alex Chalk – Secretary of State for Justice (CITY)
- Maragatham Chandrasekhar – Indian cabinet minister (KCL)
- Michael Collins – Irish independence leader (KCL)
- Sir John Cockburn – Premier of South Australia
- Thérèse Coffey – Secretary of State for Environment, Food and Rural Affairs (UCL)
- Abdulai Conteh – vice president of Sierra Leone (KCL)
- Yvette Cooper – Home Secretary (LSE)
- Sir Stafford Cripps – former Chancellor of the Exchequer (UCL)
- David Currie, Baron Currie of Marylebone – British politician, member of the House of Lords (QMUL)
- Edwina Currie – British minister (LSE)
- Hugh Dalton – Chancellor of the Exchequer (LSE)
- Joseph B. Dauda – Sierra Leonean Finance Minister (KCL)
- Frank Dobson – British minister (LSE)
- Anneliese Dodds – Minister of State for Development (LSE)
- Marlene Malahoo Forte – Jamaican Foreign Minister (KCL)
- Mahatma Gandhi – Indian Independence Leader (UCL)
- Natalia Gherman – deputy prime minister of Moldova (KCL)
- John Glen – Chief Secretary to the Treasury (KCL)
- Sir Sydney Gun-Munro – governor-general of Saint Vincent and the Grenadines (KCL)
- Eurfyl ap Gwilym – Welsh politician (KCL)
- Peter Hain, Baron Hain – British minister and anti-apartheid campaigner (QMUL)
- William Hare, 5th Earl of Listowel – governor general of Ghana (KCL)
- Peter Hennessy – Baron Hennessy of Nympsfield – British politician, member of the House of Lords (QMUL)
- Farrer Herschell, 1st Baron Herschell – Lord Chancellor (UCL)
- Ibrahim Jazi – Jordanian Minister of State for Prime Ministry Affairs
- Tessa Jowell – British minister (GCUL)
- William Joyce – wartime propagandist (BBK)
- Abdul Wahab Juned – deputy minister at the Prime Minister's Office
- Ajay Kakkar, Baron Kakkar – British surgeon, Professor of Surgery at University College London, member of the House of Lords (QMUL)
- Gillian Keegan – Secretary of State for Education (LBS)
- Ruth Kelly – British minister (LSE)
- Muhammad Zafrulla Khan – Pakistani Foreign Minister (KCL)
- David Lammy – Foreign Secretary (SOAS)
- Emily Lau – Hong Kong political leader (LSE)
- Ambrose Lau – Hong Kong political leader
- James Lowther, 1st Viscount Ullswater – Speaker of the House of Commons (KCL)
- John MacGregor, Baron MacGregor of Pulham Market – Leader of the House of Commons (KCL)
- Masidi Manjun – State Minister of Local Government and Housing, Sabah, Malaysia
- Ferdinand Alexander "Sandro" Araneta Marcos III – Member of the Philippine House of Representatives, eldest son of President Bongbong Marcos and First Lady Liza Araneta Marcos (CITY)
- Horace Maybray King, Baron Maybray-King – Speaker of the House of Commons (KCL)
- Anne McLellan – deputy prime minister of Canada (KCL)
- V. K. Krishna Menon – 3rd Defence Minister of India (UCL, LSE)
- Ken Michael – governor of Western Australia (ICL)
- Ed Miliband – Secretary of State for Energy Security and Net Zero (LSE)
- Alfred Milner, 1st Viscount Milner – British Cabinet Minister (KCL)
- Francis Minah – vice president of Sierra Leone (KCL)
- Nickolay Mladenov – Bulgarian Foreign Minister (KCL)
- Grace Mugabe – former First Lady of Zimbabwe & spouse of Robert Mugabe
- Lisa Nandy – Secretary of State for Culture, Media and Sport (BBK)
- James Nyamweya – Kenyan Foreign Minister (KCL)
- David Owen, Baron Owen of Plymouth – British Foreign Secretary (KCL)
- Jacques Parizeau – Premier of Quebec (LSE)
- Lucy Powell – Leader of the House of Commons and Lord President of the Council (KCL)
- Enoch Powell – British minister and right-wing politician (SOAS)
- Victoria Prentis – Attorney General for England and Wales & Advocate General for Northern Ireland (RHUL)
- S. Rajaratnam – deputy prime minister of Singapore and Cabinet minister (KCL)
- Sir Shridath Ramphal – Commonwealth Secretary-General and Guyanese Foreign Minister (KCL)
- Badruddin Tyabji – High Court Judge and Former President of the Indian National Congress (UCL)

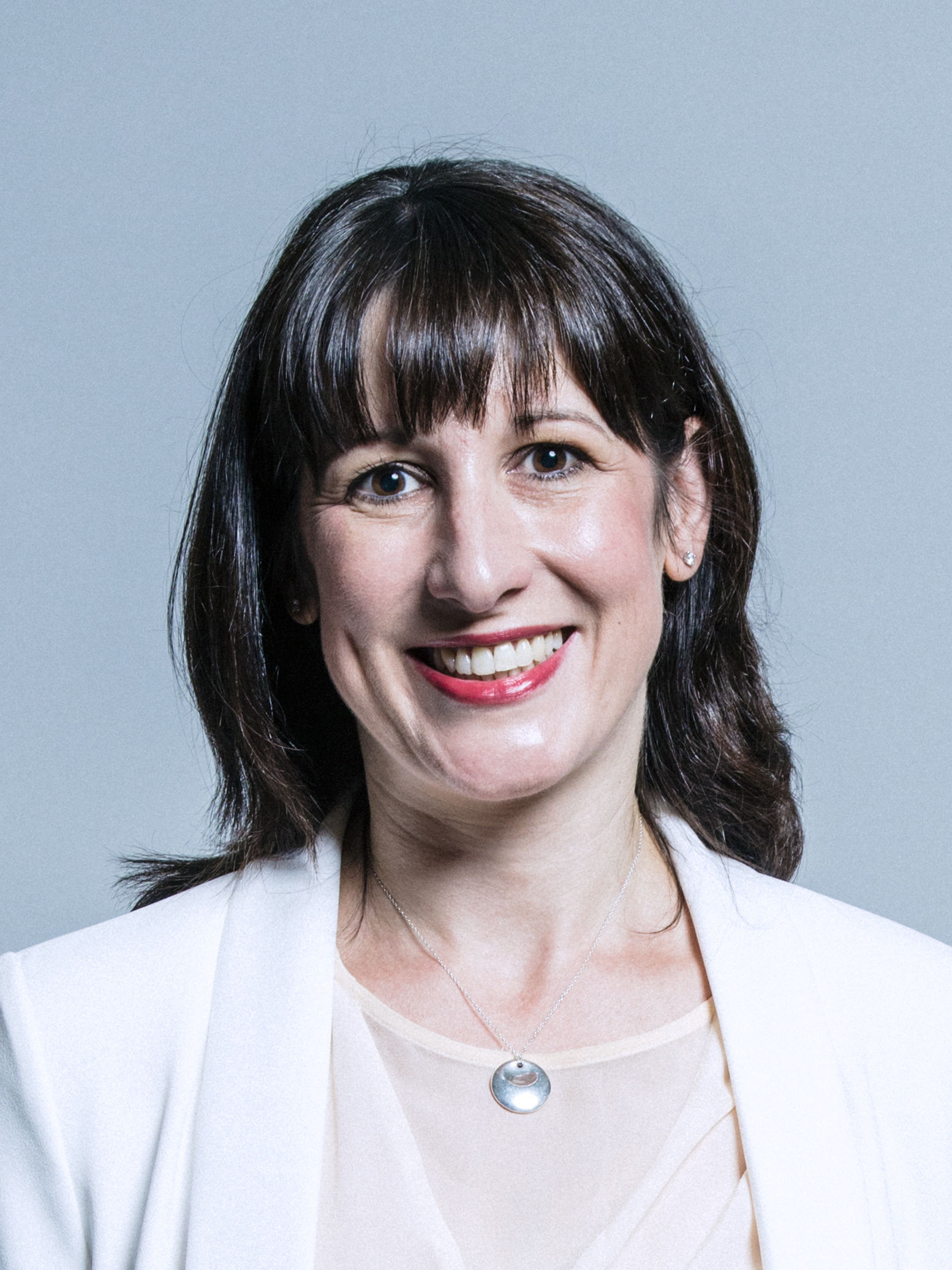
Rachel Reeves, Chancellor of the Exchequer of the United Kingdom

- Rachel Reeves – Chancellor of the Exchequer (LSE)
- Walter Rodney – Guyanese activist (SOAS)
- Winston Set Aung – politician, economist, incumbent deputy governor of the Central Bank of Myanmar
- Santu Shahaney – IOFS officer. He served as the first Indian Director General of the Indian Ordnance Factories
- Stephen Smith – Australian politician
- Robert Sobukwe – South African political dissident
- Marie Stopes – family planning and eugenics campaigner (UCL)
- Billy Strachan – pioneer of black civil rights in Britain
- Gisela Stuart – Member of Parliament, England (Birmingham Edgbaston) (ULIP)
- Goh Keng Swee – deputy prime minister of Singapore (LSE)
- Hayashi Tadasu – Japanese Foreign Minister (KCL)
- Teo Chee Hean – Singaporean minister (ICL)
- Harold Watkinson, 1st Viscount Watkinson – Minister of Defence (KCL)
- Frederick Wills – Guyanese Foreign Minister (KCL)
- David Wilson – governor of Hong Kong
- Harry Woolf, Baron Woolf – chief justice of England and Wales (UCL)
- Rais Yatim – Malaysian Foreign Minister (KCL)
- Nadhim Zahawi – former Chancellor of the Exchequer, Secretary of State for Education, chairman of the Conservative Party (UCL)
- Rafiq Zakaria – Indian politician
- Ahmad Ziadat – Jordanian Minister of Justice

=== United Nations ===
- Jamal Benomar – United Nations Under-Secretary-General
- Kemal Derviş – administrator of the United Nations Development Programme (2005 to 2009)
- Nitin Desai – United Nations Under-Secretary-General for Economic and Social Affairs (1992 to 2003)
- Julian Harston – United Nations Assistant Secretary-General
- John Hocking – United Nations Assistant Secretary-General
- Mark Lowcock – United Nations Under-Secretary-General for Humanitarian Affairs and Emergency Relief Coordinator
- David Nabarro – Special Adviser to the United Nations Secretary-General on the 2030 Agenda for Sustainable Development and Climate Change
- Achim Steiner – administrator of the United Nations Development Programme

=== United States ===
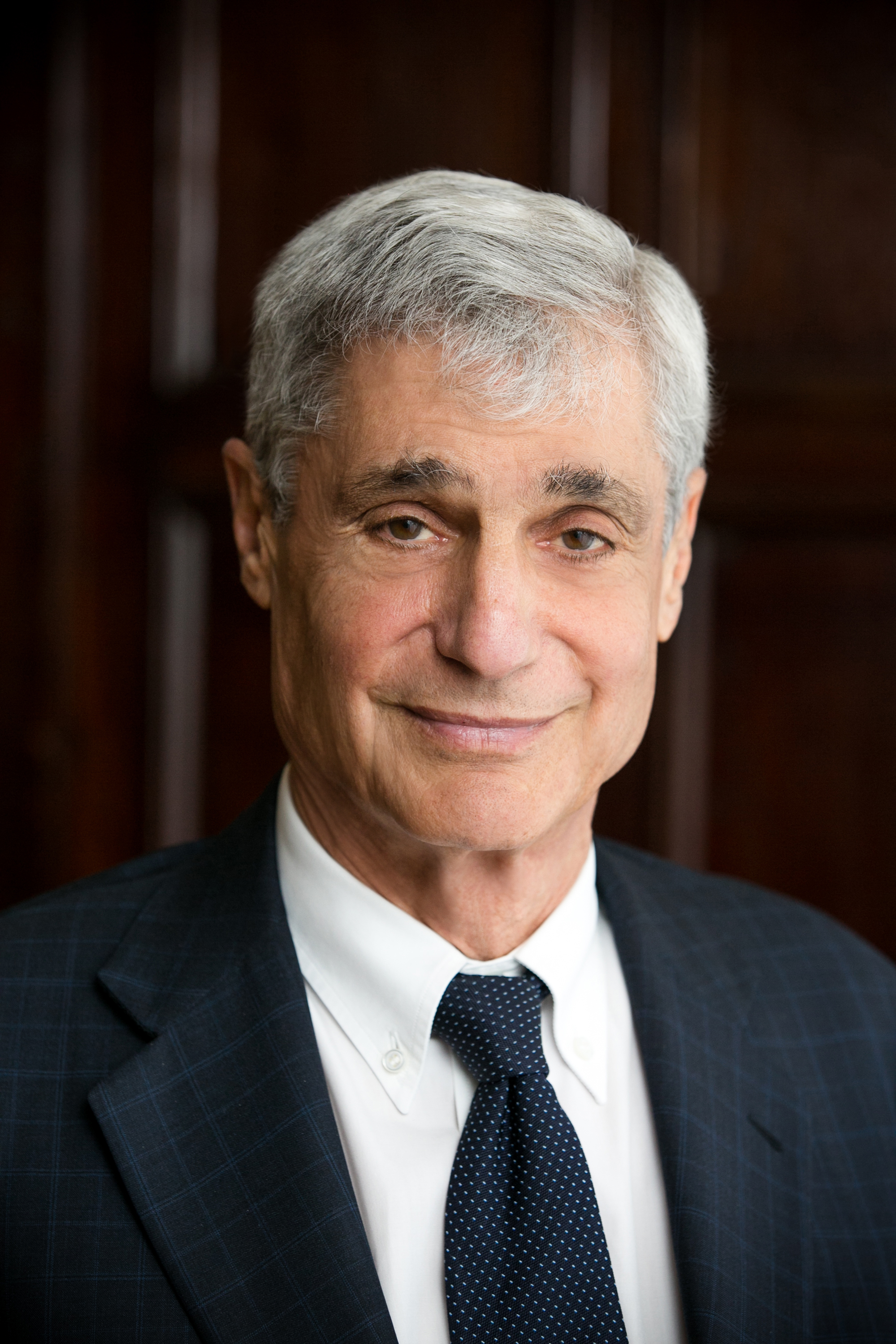
Robert Rubin, 70th U.S. Secretary of the Treasury during the Clinton administration

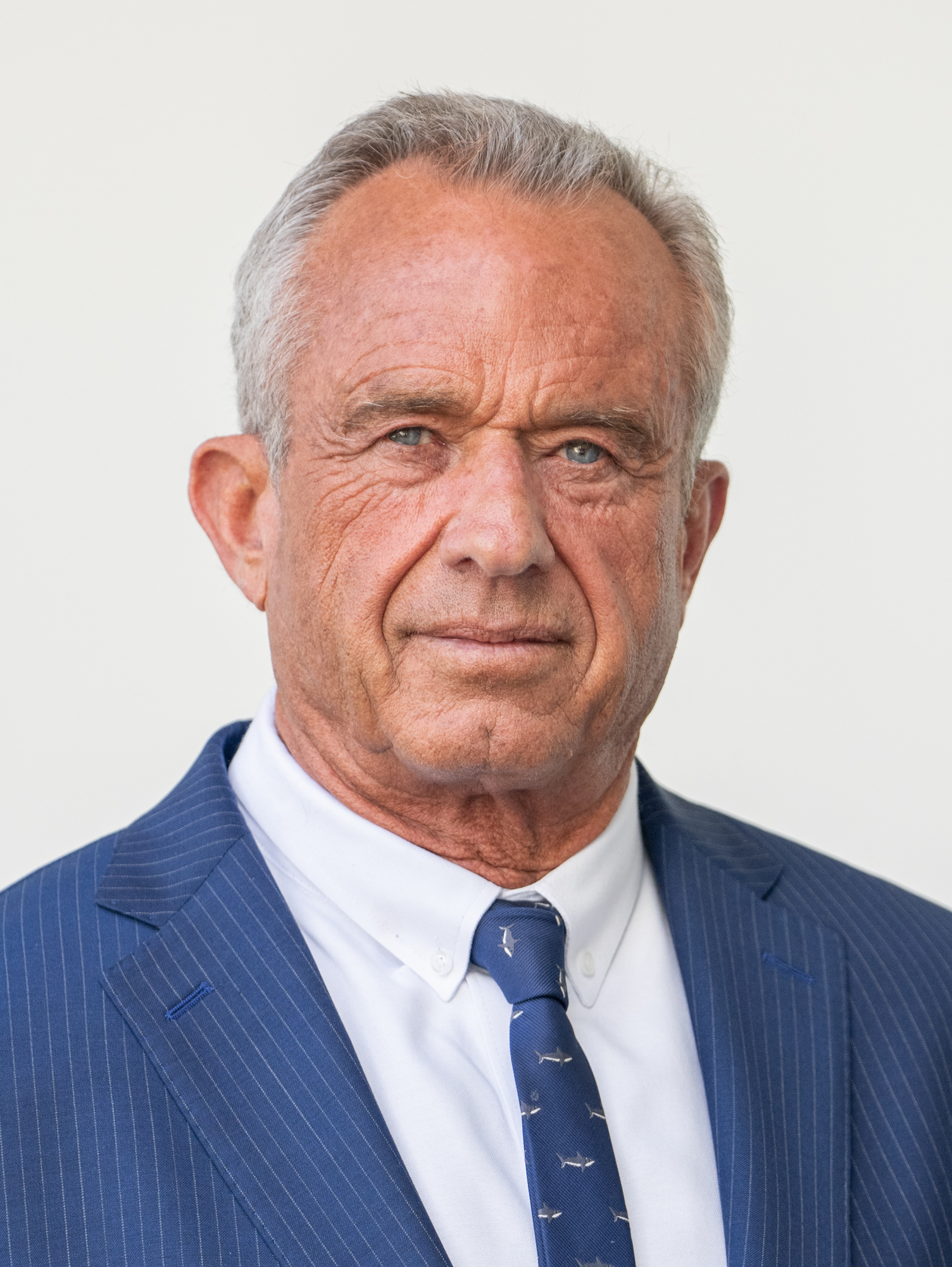
Robert F. Kennedy Jr., 26th U.S. Secretary of Health and Human Services (2025-present)

- Elliott Abrams – United States Special Representative for Iran and Venezuela (LSE)
- Matt Cartwright – U.S. representative for Pennsylvania's 8th congressional district (LSE)
- Raymond F. Clevenger – former U.S. representative for Michigan's 11th congressional district (LSE)
- Rosa DeLauro – U.S. representative for Connecticut's 3rd congressional district (LSE)
- Leandra English – deputy director of the Consumer Financial Protection Bureau (LSE)
- Joseph L. Fisher – former U.S. representative for Virginia's 10th congressional district (LSE)
- Sebastian Gorka – deputy assistant to the president and senior director for counterterrorism (HEY)
- Marc Grossman – Under Secretary of State
- Don Johnson Jr. – former U.S. representative for Georgia's 10th congressional district (LSE)
- Jim Leach – former U.S. representative for Iowa's 2nd congressional district (LSE)
- Robert F. Kennedy Jr. – Secretary of the United States Department of Health and Human Services and former US presidential candidate (LSE)
- Ron Kind – U.S. representative for Wisconsin's 3rd congressional district (LSE)
- Mark Kirk – U.S. senator from Illinois (LSE)
- James McGreevey – former governor of New Jersey (LSE)
- Ann Dore McLaughlin – U.S. Secretary of Labor
- Brad Miller – former U.S. representative for North Carolina's 13th congressional district (LSE)
- Daniel Patrick Moynihan – U.S. senator from New York (LSE)
- Jon Ossoff – U.S. senator from Georgia (LSE)
- Carter Page – foreign policy advisor to Donald Trump (SOAS)
- Kash Patel – director of the Federal Bureau of Investigation (UCL)
- Alice Paul – suffragist (LSE)
- Richard Perle – political advisor (LSE)
- Otis G. Pike – former U.S. representative for New York's 1st congressional district (LSE)
- Max Rose – U.S. representative for New York's 11th congressional district (LSE)
- B. Carroll Reece – former U.S. representative for Tennessee's 1st congressional district (LSE)
- Robert Rubin – U.S. Treasury Secretary
- Lynn Schenk – former U.S. representative for California's 49th congressional district (LSE)
- Mikie Sherrill – U.S. representative for New Jersey's 11th congressional district (LSE)
- Jefferson Shreve – U.S. representative for Indiana's 6th congressional district (UOL)
- John Tower – U.S. senator from Texas (LSE)
- David Welch – Assistant Secretary of State
- Tom Wolf – governor of Pennsylvania (UOL)
- Todd Young – U.S. senator from Indiana (SAS)

== Monarchs and royalty ==
- Hamdan bin Mohammed Al Maktoum – Crown Prince of Dubai (LSE)
- Camilla – Queen of the United Kingdom and other Commonwealth realms (Note: Attended; did not graduate.) (ULP)
- Abdulaziz bin Turki al Faisal – grandson of King Faisal of Saudi Arabia (SOAS)
- Tuanku Jaafar – King of Malaysia, 1994–1999 (LSE)
- Letsie III of Lesotho – King of Lesotho
- Margrethe II of Denmark – Queen of Denmark, 1972–present (LSE)
- Haakon Magnus – Crown Prince of Norway (LSE)
- Mette-Marit – Crown Princess of Norway (SOAS)
- Napoléon, Prince Imperial – son of Emperor Napoleon III (KCL)
- Princess Beatrice – member of British royal family (GCUL)
- Princess Laurentien – wife of Prince Constantijn (QMUL)
- Prince Prisdang – member of the Thai royal family (KCL)
- Sultan Salahuddin – king of Malaysia 1999–2001 (SOAS)

== Armed forces and military ==
- Ernst Boepple (1887–1950) – German Nazi official and SS officer executed for war crimes
- Robert Fry – lieutenant general in the Royal Marines (KCL)
- John Harding, 1st Baron Harding of Petherton – field marshal and Chief of the Imperial General Staff (KCL)
- Syed Ata Hasnain – lieutenant general in the Indian Army (KCL)
- Emmanuel Karenzi Karake – lieutenant general in Rwandan Defence Forces
- Ben Key – vice admiral in the Royal Navy (Royal Holloway)
- James Fitzgerald Martin – major general in the British Army and Honorary Surgeon to King George VI
- Richard Nugee – lieutenant general in the British Army and Chief of Defence People (KCL)
- Jonathon Riley – lieutenant general in the British Army (UCL)
- Julian Thompson – major general in the Royal Marines (KCL)

== Clergy and religious figures ==
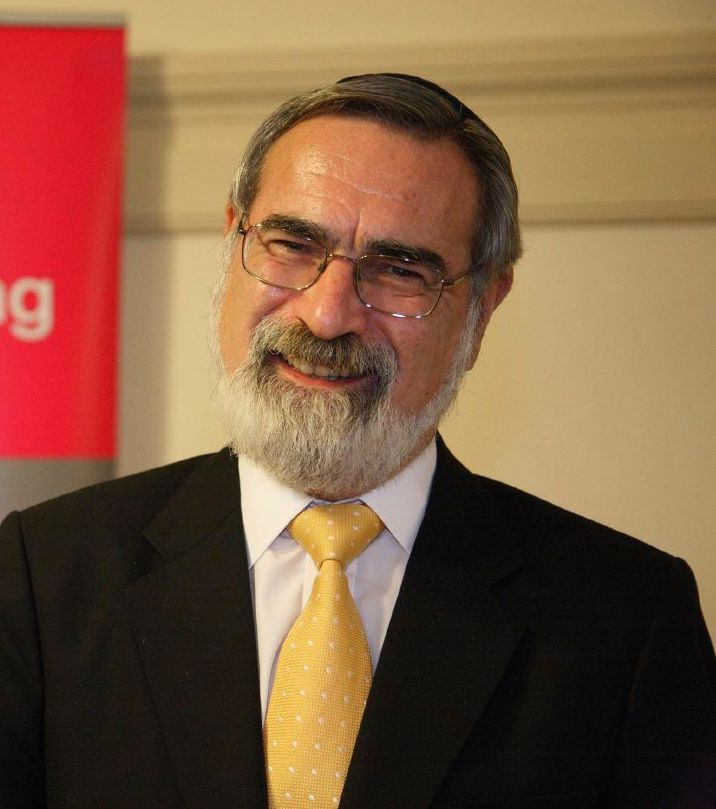
Sir Jonathan Sacks, former Chief Rabbi of the United Kingdom and the Commonwealth

- Mirza Tahir Ahmad – Khalifatul Masih IV, Caliph (Imam) IV of the Ahmadiyya Muslim Community
- Alan Campbell – controversial Pentecostal pastor
- George Carey, Baron Carey of Clifton – Archbishop of Canterbury (KCL)
- Oliver D. Crisp (KCL)
- Robert William Dale – Nonconformist church leader
- Mark Elvins – Capuchin friar (HEY)
- Philip Edgecumbe Hughes – New Testament scholar, Professor at Westminster Theological Seminary
- Bernard Lonergan – theologian, philosopher and economist (HEY)
- John Anthony McGuckin – Orthodox priest and poet (HEY)
- Michael Anthony Moxon – Dean of Truro Cathedral (HEY)
- Njongonkulu Ndungane – Archbishop of Cape Town (KCL)
- Keith Riglin – Bishop of Argyll and The Isles (HEY) (KCL)
- Sir Jonathan Sacks – former Chief Rabbi of the United Kingdom and the Commonwealth (KCL)
- Berhaneyesus Demerew Souraphiel – Catholic cardinal and Archbishop of Addis Abeba
- Lindsay Urwin – Bishop of Horsham (HEY)

=== Other religious figures ===
- Heidi Baker – Christian missionary (KCL)
- Muhammad Abdul Bari – Secretary General of the Muslim Council of Britain (KCL)
- Shaw Clifton – General of The Salvation Army (KCL)
- Francis Lyon Cohen – rabbi and Army chaplain (KCL)
- Richard Coles – priest, musician and journalist (KCL)
- Leonard Coulshaw – Chaplain of the Fleet (KCL)
- Frank Curtis – Provost of Sheffield (KCL)
- Thomas Pelham Dale – Ritualist clergyman (KCL)
- Rob Frost – Methodist evangelist (KCL)
- Robert Gandell – biblical scholar (KCL)
- Donald Clifford Gray – clergyman (KCL)
- Walter Homolka – rabbi (KCL)
- Donald Howard – Provost of St Andrew's Cathedral, Aberdeen (KCL)
- Lawrence Jackson – Provost of Blackburn (KCL)
- Eric James – Chaplain Extraordinary to HM the Queen (KCL)
- George Jack Kinnell – Provost of St Andrew's Cathedral, Aberdeen (KCL)
- Kenneth Leech – priest (KCL)
- Peter Mallett – Chaplain-General to the Forces (KCL)
- Michael Nott – Provost of Portsmouth (KCL)
- Hugh Smith – Chaplain-General of Prisons (KCL)
- Frederick Spurrell – priest and archaeologist (KCL)

== Nobel Peace Prize ==
- Óscar Arias (LSE)
- Ralph Bunche (LSE)
- Nelson Mandela (ULIP)
- Philip Noel-Baker (LSE)
- Aung San Suu Kyi (SOAS)
- Joseph Rotblat (QMUL)
- Archbishop Desmond Tutu (KCL)

== Nobel Prize for Literature ==
- T. S. Eliot (BBK)
- Harold Pinter (CSSD)
- Bertrand Russell (LSE)
- George Bernard Shaw (LSE)
- Wole Soyinka (ULIP)
- Rabindranath Tagore (UCL)
- Mario Vargas Llosa (KCL/QMUL)
- Derek Walcott (ULIP)

== Scientists and mathematicians ==
=== Biologists and botanists ===
- David Bellamy (KCL & RHUL)
- Keith Campbell – led team that cloned Dolly the sheep (KCL)
- Qui-Lim Choo – co-discoverer of Hepatitis C and of the Hepatitis D genome (KCL)
- Soraya Dhillon – pharmacologist (KCL)
- Devendra Prasad Gupta – academic (KCL)
- W.D. Hamilton (LSE)
- Michael Houghton – co-discoverer of Hepatitis C and of the Hepatitis D genome (KCL)
- Thomas Henry Huxley (ICL)
- Richard Owen (QMUL)
- Robert Swinhoe
- Katherine Warington (RHUL)

=== Chemists ===
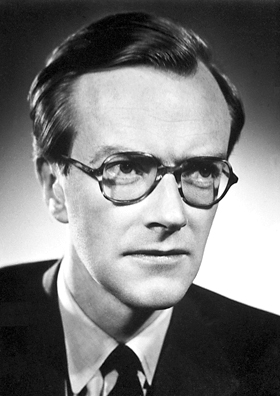
Maurice Wilkins, known for contributions to the discovery of the structure of DNA

- Sir Derek Barton (ICL & BBK)
- Michael P. Barnett (KCL)
- William Boon (KCL)
- John Eddowes Bowman the Younger (KCL)
- Sir John Cadogan (KCL)
- Sir Arthur Herbert Church (KCL)
- G Marius Clore (UCL)
- Leslie Crombie (KCL)
- Sir William Crookes (ICL)
- Charles Frederick Cross (KCL)
- John Frederic Daniell (KCL)
- Richard Dixon (KCL)
- Sir Arthur Duckham – president of the Institution of Chemical Engineers
- Sir Edward Frankland (QMUL & ICL)
- Rosalind Franklin (KCL & BBK)
- Victor Gold (KCL)
- Leticia González (KCL)
- Otto Hahn (UCL)
- Sir Walter Haworth (ICL)
- Jaroslav Heyrovský (UCL)
- Sir Graham Hills (BBK)
- August Wilhelm von Hofmann (ICL)
- Sir Cyril Hinshelwood (ICL)
- Sir Herbert Jackson (KCL)
- Sir Aaron Klug (BBK)
- Michael Levitt (KCL)
- Nick Lane (UCL)
- Catherine Nobes (UCL)
- Augustine Ong (KCL)
- Geoffrey Ozin (KCL)
- Arthur Thomas Palin – pioneer in water quality testing
- Sir William Henry Perkin (ICL)
- William Henry Perkin Jr. (ICL)
- Raymond Peters (KCL)
- Sir George Porter (ICL/UCL)
- Juda Hirsch Quastel (ICL)
- Sir William Ramsay (UCL)
- Sir Robert Robinson (UCL)
- Eric Scerri (KCL)
- Sir Frederick Soddy (UCL)
- Richard Laurence Millington Synge (LI)
- Sir Jocelyn Field Thorpe (KCL)
- Alexander Robertus Todd (LI)
- Vincent du Vigneaud (UCL)
- Maurice Wilkins (KCL)
- Sir Geoffrey Wilkinson (ICL)

=== Computer scientists ===
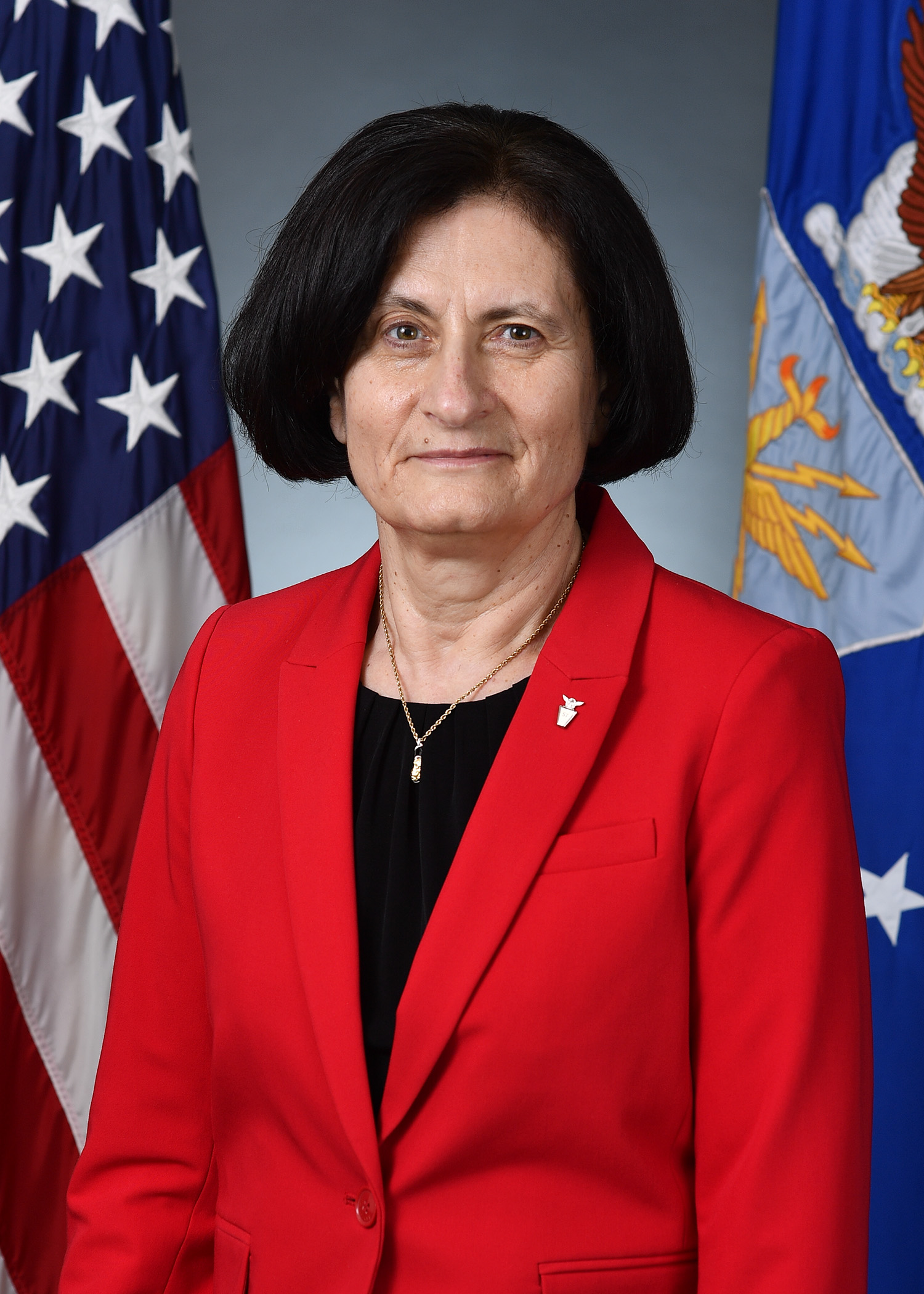
Victoria Coleman, 37th Chief Scientist of the U.S. Air Force

- Steve Bourne (KCL)
- Victoria Coleman – 37th Chief Scientist of the U.S. Air Force
- Ian H. S. Cullimore (KCL)
- Darren Dalcher (KCL)
- Dora Metcalf (KCL)
- Hassan Ugail (KCL)

=== Engineers and Inventors ===
- Sir William Anderson (KCL)
- Rutherford Aris
- Kevin Ashton (UCL)
- Ayodele Awojobi (ICL)
- Richard Beeching, Baron Beeching (ICL)
- Alexander Graham Bell (UCL)
- Henry Brogden (KCL)
- Henry Marc Brunel (KCL)
- William Clark (KCL)
- Donald Watts Davies (ICL)
- Henry Deane (KCL)
- James H. Ellis (ICL)
- Tommy Flowers
- Sir Douglas Fox (KCL)
- Sir Stanley Hooker (ICL)
- Sir Alec Issigonis (ULIP)
- Walter Katte (KCL)
- Frederick William Lanchester (ICL)
- Sir William Henry Preece (KCL)
- Alec Reeves (ICL)
- Bill Strang (KCL)
- Thomas A. Walker (KCL)
- Sir Charles Wheatstone (KCL)
- Mark Whitby (KCL)
- Sir John Wolfe-Barry (KCL)

=== Geologists, environmental scientists and physical geographers ===
- John Anthony Allan (SOAS and KCL)
- George Barrow (KCL)
- Henry William Bristow (KCL)
- Robert Ashington Bullen (KCL)
- David Edgar Cartwright (KCL)
- Max Coleman (geoscientist)
- Beris Cox
- Sir George Deacon (KCL)
- Archibald Thomas John Dollar (KCL)
- William Fyfe (ICL)
- Arthur Holmes (ICL)
- Rosemary Hutton
- Mike Hulme (KCL)
- David Lary (KCL)
- David Linton (KCL)
- Sir Charles Lyell (KCL)
- Halford John Mackinder (LSE)
- John Milne – inventor of the seismometer (KCL)
- Grant Mossop (ICL)
- Madeline Munro (UCL)
- Charles F. Newcombe
- Sir Dudley Stamp (KCL)
- James Haward Taylor (KCL)
- Sir Gilbert Walker (ICL)
- Errol White (KCL)
- Sidney Wooldridge (KCL)

=== Immunologists ===
- Noreen Murray – molecular geneticist who helped develop a vaccine against hepatitis B (KCL)
- Anne O'Garra (UCL)
- Max Theiler – 1951 Nobel laureate who developed a vaccine against yellow fever (KCL)

=== Mathematicians ===
- David Acheson (KCL)
- Sir Arthur Lyon Bowley (LSE)
- Colin Bushnell (KCL)
- Sir David Cox (BBK & ICL)
- Keith Devlin (KCL)
- Simon Donaldson (ICL)
- Graham Everest (KCL)
- Aubrey William Ingleton (KCL)
- Leon Mirsky (KCL)
- Louis Mordell (BBK)
- Klaus Roth (UCL & ICL)
- Sir Martin Taylor (KCL)
- Patrick du Val (ULIP)
- Henry William Watson (KCL)
- Tom Willmore (KCL)

=== Nurses ===
- Alice Fisher (KCL)
- Florence Nightingale (KCL)
- Lucy Osburn (KCL)
- Kofoworola Abeni Pratt (KCL)
- Emmy Rappe (KCL)
- Cicely Saunders (KCL)
- Henny Tscherning (KCL)
- Theodora Turner (KCL)

=== Physicians ===
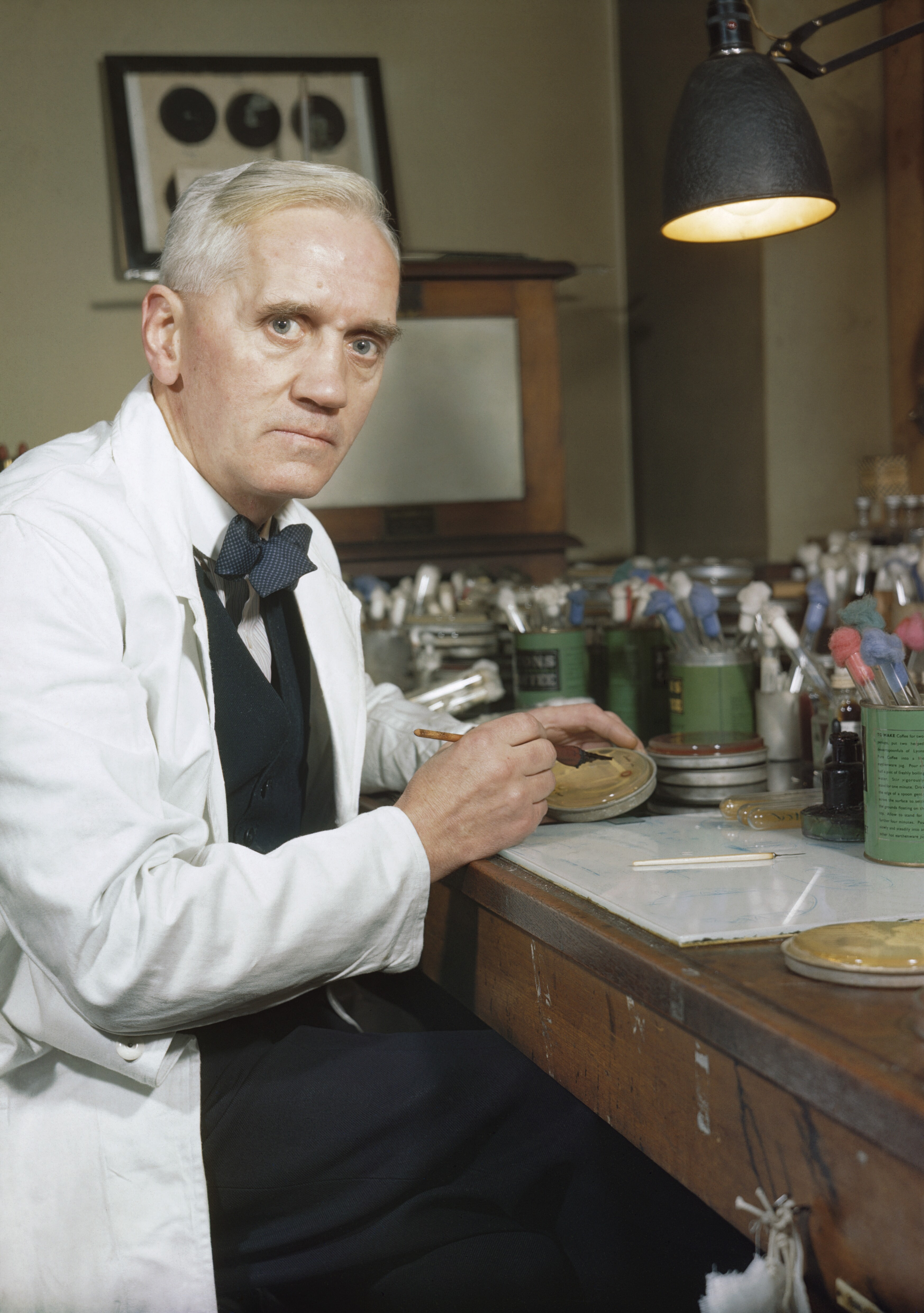
Alexander Fleming, physician and microbiologist

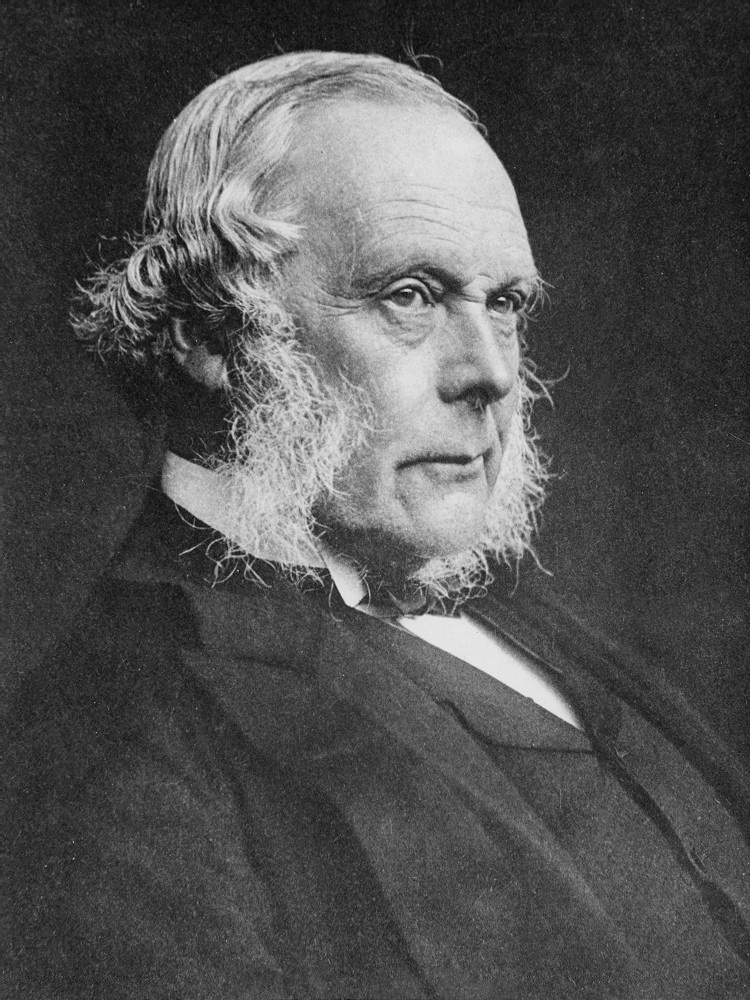
Joseph Lister, pioneer of antiseptic surgery

- Tedros Adhanom (LSHTM) – 8th director-general of the World Health Organization
- Edgar Adrian (QMUL)
- Francis Anstie (KCL)
- Simon Baron-Cohen (KCL)
- Thomas Gregor Brodie (KCL)
- Edgar Crookshank (KCL)
- Henry Hallett Dale (QMUL)
- Ara Darzi, Baron Darzi of Denham (ICL)
- David Blow (ICL)
- Thomas Bond (KCL)
- Alexander Fleming – physician and microbiologist (ICL)
- Michael Foster (UCL)
- Henry Gray (SGUL)
- Thomas Hodgkin (KCL)
- John Hunter (SGUL)
- William Hunter (SGUL)
- Edward Jenner (SGUL)
- Joseph Lister (KCL)
- Peter Mansfield (QMUL)
- J. F. O. Mustapha
- Sir Victor Ewings Negus (KCL)
- Ronald Ross (QMUL)
- Nancy Rothwell – physiologist and academic administrator (KCL)
- Patrick Steptoe (SGUL)
- John Vane (QMUL)
- Robert Winston, Baron Winston (ICL/QMUL)
- Guy Alfred Wyon

=== Physicists and astronomers ===
- Sir Edward Appleton (KCL)
- Charles Barkla (KCL)
- J. D. Bernal (BBK)
- Patrick Blackett, Baron Blackett (ICL)
- Sir William Henry Bragg (UCL)
- Jocelyn Burnell (UCL)
- Louis Essen
- Andrew Fabian (KCL)
- Michael Fisher (KCL)
- Sir John Ambrose Fleming (UCL)
- Dennis Gabor (ICL)
- Marcelo Gleiser (KCL)
- Raymond Gosling (KCL)
- Peter Higgs (KCL)
- Charles K. Kao (UCL/ICL)
- Geraint F. Lewis
- Kathleen Lonsdale (RHUL & UCL)
- Claudio Maccone (KCL)
- Robert May, Baron May of Oxford (ICL)
- James Clerk Maxwell (KCL)
- John Edwin Midwinter (KCL)
- Anna Moore
- William George Penney (ICL)
- Sir Owen Richardson (KCL)
- Abdus Salam (ICL)
- Keith Shine (ICL)
- Simon Singh (ICL)
- Louis Slotin (KCL)
- Duncan Steel
- Edward James Stone (KCL)
- Edward Teller (UCL)
- Sir George Paget Thomson (ICL)
- Thomas Young (SGUL)

=== Psychologists, sociologists and anthropologists ===
- Akbar S. Ahmed (SOAS)
- Dinesh Bhugra (KCL)
- Raymond Cattell (KCL)
- Havelock Ellis (KCL)
- Fei Xiaotong (LSE)
- Dame Uta Frith (KCL)
- Anthony Giddens (LSE)
- David Hirsh
- Carol Jeffrey
- Satoshi Kanazawa (LSE)
- Ernest Krausz (1931–2018)
- Bronislaw Malinowski (LSE)
- Karl Mannheim (LSE)
- Z.K. Mathews (LSE)
- Humphry Osmond (KCL)
- Talcott Parsons (LSE)
- J. Philippe Rushton (BBK)
- Ulrike Schmidt (KCL)
- Jane Stewart
- Arthur Waley (SOAS)

== The arts ==
=== Novelists, poets and playwrights ===
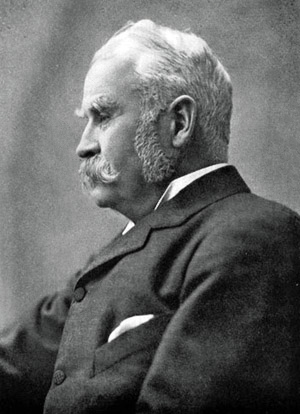
Sir W. S. Gilbert of Gilbert and Sullivan

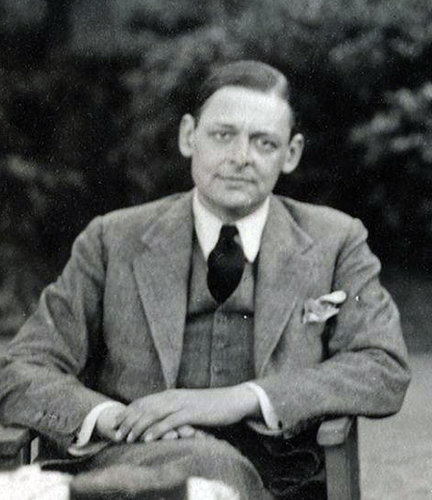
T. S. Eliot, poet and editor

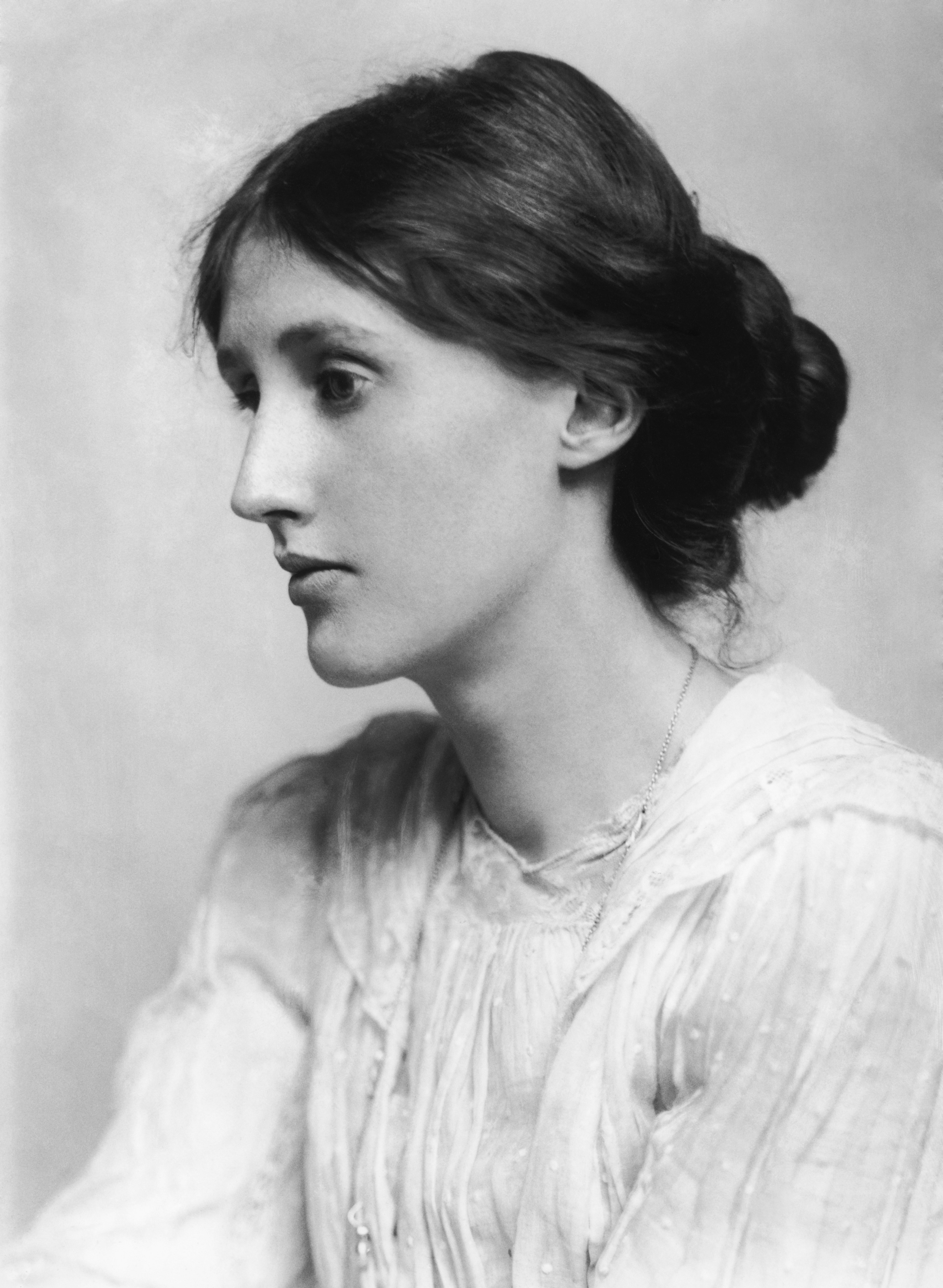
Virginia Woolf, writer

- Dannie Abse (KCL)
- John Adair (KCL)
- Alfred Ainger (KCL)
- Richard Aldington (UCL)
- Mulk Raj Anand (UCL)
- Pralhad Keshav Atre – Indian writer
- Alfred Austin
- J. G. Ballard (QMUL)
- Arnold Bennett
- Alain de Botton (KCL)
- Sir Malcolm Bradbury (QMUL)
- Raymond Briggs (UCL)
- Anita Brookner (KCL)
- Robert Browning (UCL)
- Urvashi Butalia – Indian feminist writer, publisher, and activist
- G. K. Chesterton (UCL)
- Arthur C. Clarke (KCL)
- Alex Comfort – writer of The Joy of Sex (UCL)
- Dame Ivy Compton-Burnett (RHUL)
- Bernard Cornwell
- Richmal Crompton (RHUL)
- George Eliot (RHUL)
- T. S. Eliot (BBK)
- Nissim Ezekiel (BBK)
- C. S. Forester (KCL)
- Sir W. S. Gilbert (KCL)
- Ann Granger
- Michael Grothaus (CITY)
- Radclyffe Hall (KCL)
- Thomas Hardy (KCL)
- Susan Hill (KCL)
- Ruth Prawer Jhabvala (QMUL)
- John Keats (KCL)
- Charles Kingsley (KCL)
- Hanif Kureishi (KCL)
- W. Somerset Maugham (KCL)
- Nurul Momen – Bangladeshi playwright and Natyaguru
- Michael Morpurgo (KCL)
- Andrew Motion (RHUL)
- China Miéville (LSE)
- Gladys Mitchell (GCUL)
- John Ruskin (KCL)
- Lao She (SOAS)
- Sir Leslie Stephen (KCL)
- H. G. Wells (ICL & ULIP)
- Virginia Woolf (KCL)
- Samir El-Youssef

=== Actors, comedians and TV stars ===
- Adewale Akinnuoye-Agbaje (KCL)
- Sir David Attenborough (LSE)
- Rory Bremner (KCL)
- Graham Chapman (QMUL)
- Julian Clary (GCUL)
- Quentin Crisp – writer, actor and raconteur (KCL)
- Emma Freud (RHUL)
- Greer Garson (KCL)
- Ricky Gervais (UCL)
- Loyd Grossman (LSE)
- Zoheb Hassan (GCUL)
- Harry Hill (SGUL)
- Cairns James
- Dom Joly (SOAS)
- Boris Karloff
- Robert Kilroy-Silk (LSE)
- Bill O'Reilly (QMUL)
- Devika Rani (RAM)
- Daisy Ridley (BBK)
- Mark Strong (RHUL)
- Bree Turner (KCL)
- Sir Charles Wyndham (KCL)

=== Directors and film-makers ===
- Herbert Brenon (KCL)
- Derek Jarman (KCL)
- Laura Mulvey (BBK)
- Christopher Nolan (UCL)

=== Musicians, composers and conductors ===
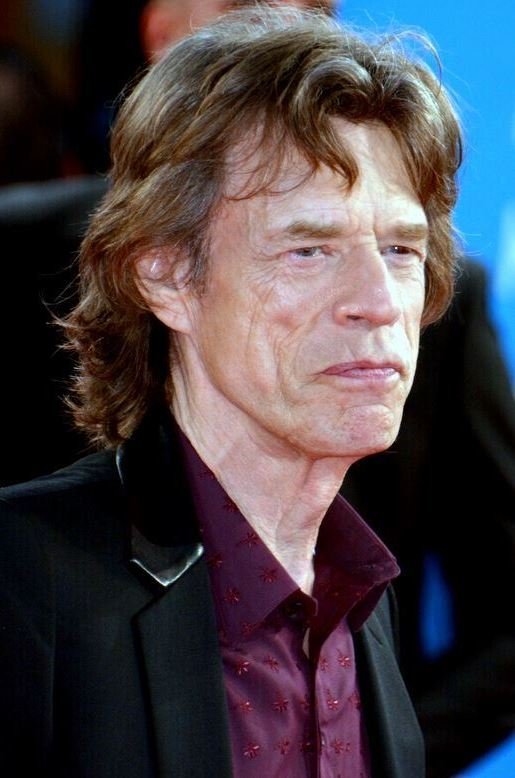
Mick Jagger, English singer and composer

- Filiz Ali – pianist and musicologist (KCL)
- Peter Asher – musician and record producer (KCL)
- Sir John Barbirolli – conductor (RAM)
- Arnold Bax – composer (RAM)
- Sir Richard Rodney Bennett – composer (RAM)
- Sir Harrison Birtwistle – composer (RAM & KCL)
- Fiona Brice – violinist (KCL)
- Dennis Brain – French hornist (RAM)
- Ming Bridges – singer (KCL)
- David Bruce – composer (KCL)
- Steven Burke – video game music composer and sound designer (KCL)
- Bernard Butler – Suede (QMUL)
- John Cale – The Velvet Underground (GCUL)
- Coldplay members Chris Martin, Will Champion, and Jon Buckland (UCL)
- Sir Clifford Curzon – pianist (RAM)
- John Dankworth – jazz composer (RAM)
- John Deacon – Queen (KCL)
- Dido – singer and songwriter (BBK)
- Suzi Digby – conductor and musician (KCL)
- Pete Doherty – The Libertines (QMUL)
- Bruce Dickinson – Iron Maiden (QMUL)
- John Evan – keyboardist for Jethro Tull (KCL)
- Lesley Garrett – soprano (RAM)
- Sir John Eliot Gardiner – conductor (KCL)
- Sir W. S. Gilbert – one half of Gilbert and Sullivan (KCL)
- Evelyn Glennie – percussionist (RAM)
- Nazia Hassan – singer
- Dame Myra Hess – pianist (RAM)
- Joe Jackson (RAM)
- Mick Jagger – The Rolling Stones (LSE)
- Alex James – Blur (GCUL)
- Sir Elton John (RAM)
- Linton Kwesi Johnson (GCUL)
- Judge Jules – trance DJ, BBC Radio 1 (LSE)
- Dame Felicity Lott – soprano (RHUL & RAM)
- Brian May – Queen (ICL)
- Brian Molko – Placebo (GCUL)
- Michael Nyman – composer (KCL & RAM)
- Kele Okereke – Bloc Party (KCL)
- Denise Orme – music hall singer (RAM)
- Mat Osman – Suede (LSE)
- Alec Palao – musician, music historian, producer (KCL)
- Sir Simon Rattle – conductor (RAM)
- Paul Robeson – American athlete, actor, singer and civil rights activist (SOAS)
- Sir Arthur Sullivan – one half of Gilbert and Sullivan (RAM)
- Adnan Sami (KCL)
- Gilli Smyth – musician who performed with Gong amongst others (KCL)
- Howard Talbot – composer and conductor (KCL)
- Jody Talbot – composer (RHUL)
- Jeffrey Tate – conductor (KCL)
- KT Tunstall – singer-songwriter (RHUL)
- Dame Eva Turner – opera singer (RAM)
- Maxim Vengerov – violinist (RAM)
- Sir Henry Wood – conductor (RAM)
- Yiruma – pianist (KCL)
- Justin Hayward Young – lead singer of The Vaccines (KCL)
- Terence Yung – pianist (UOL)

=== Artists ===
- Pegaret Anthony (KCL)
- Bernd Behr (GCUL)
- Vanessa Bell (KCL)
- Albert Bruce-Joy (KCL)
- Joseph Crawhall III (KCL)
- Ian Davenport (GCUL)
- Grenville Davey (GCUL)
- Tristram Ellis (KCL)
- Peter Henry Emerson (KCL)
- Tracey Emin (GCUL)
- Anya Gallaccio (GCUL)
- Cyril Wiseman Herbert (KCL)
- Damien Hirst (GCUL)
- Gary Hume (GCUL)
- Michael Landy (GCUL)
- Sarah Lucas (GCUL)
- Wendy McMurdo (GCUL)
- Steve McQueen (GCUL)
- Cathy de Monchaux (GCUL)
- Ronald Moody (KCL)
- Richard Mosse (KCL)
- Robyn O'Neil (KCL)
- Simon Patterson (GCUL)
- Mary Quant – fashion designer (GCUL)
- Bridget Riley (GCUL)
- Etso Ugbodaga-Ngu – artist and educator
- Mark Wallinger (GCUL)
- Sophia Wellbeloved (KCL)
- Gillian Wearing (GCUL)
- Catherine Yass (GCUL)

== Businesspeople ==
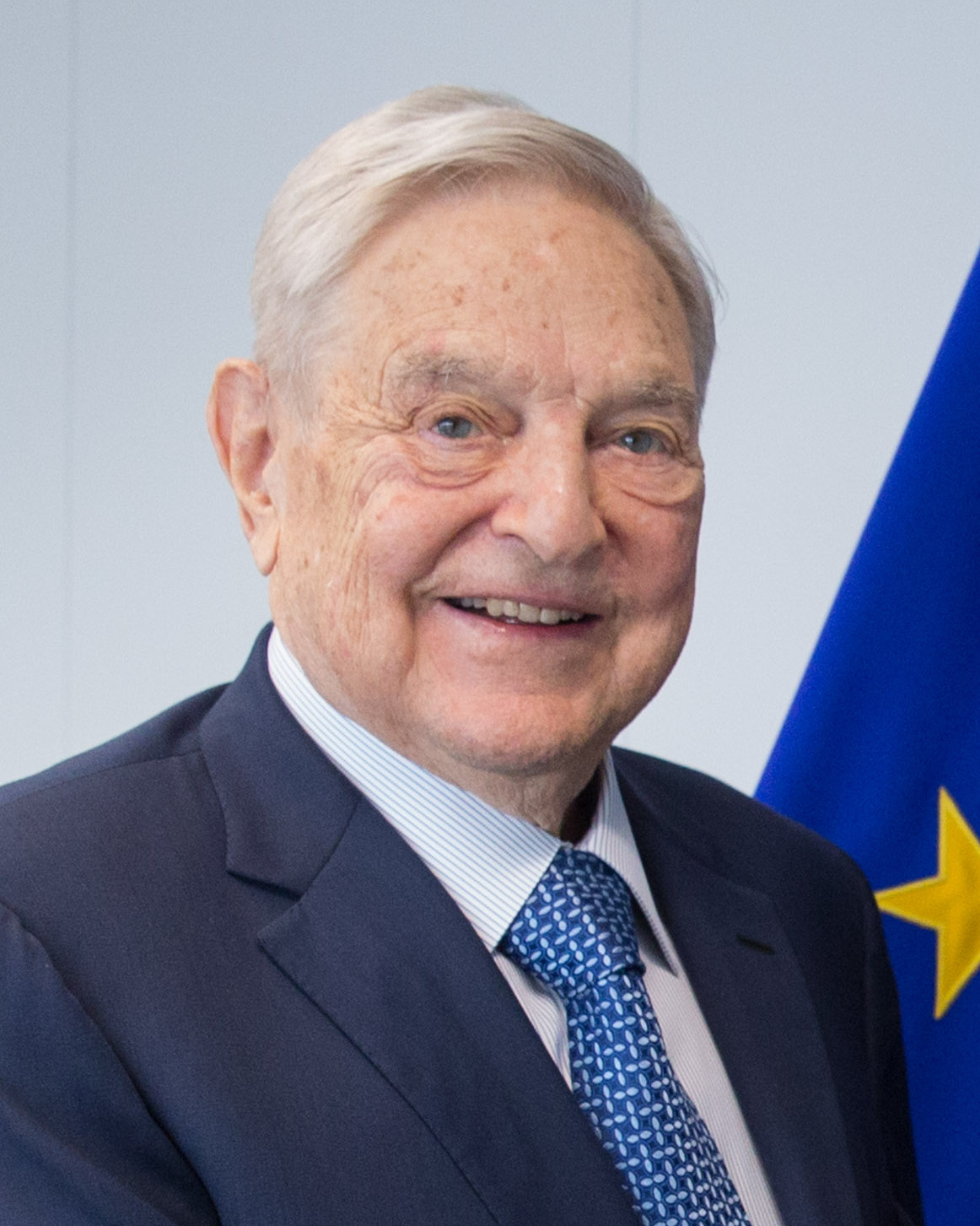
George Soros, billionaire investor and philanthropist

- Rakesh Aggarwal (KCL)
- Sir David Arculus – chairman of the board, O2 (LBS)
- Delphine Arnault – billionaire French businesswoman (LSE)
- Walter Owen Bentley – founder of Bentley Motors (KCL)
- Kumar Mangalam Birla – chairman of Aditya Birla Group (LBS)
- Michael Birch – founder of Bebo (ICL)
- Chew Choon Seng – CEO of Singapore Airlines (ICL)
- Iain Conn – group managing director of BP (ICL)
- Michael Cowpland – founder of Corel (ICL)
- Keith Duckworth – founder of Cosworth Engineering (ICL)
- Colin Dyer – CEO of Jones Lang LaSalle (ICL)
- Clara Furse – chief executive of the London Stock Exchange (LSE)
- Sir Richard Greenbury – former chairman and chief executive of Marks & Spencer (LBS)
- Calouste Gulbenkian – Armenian oil magnate (KCL)
- Stelios Haji-Ioannou – founder of EasyGroup (LSE)
- Klaus Heymann – entrepreneur & founder of Naxos Records (KCL)
- Omar Ishrak – chairman & CEO of Medtronic (KCL)
- Huw Jenkins – CEO of UBS Investment Bank (LBS)
- Moez Kassam – founder of Anson Group (LBS)
- Koh Boon Hwee – chairman of DBS Bank, Singapore(ICL)
- Spiro Latsis – billionaire (LSE)
- Charles Lee – former chairman of the Hong Kong Stock Exchange (LSE)
- Lim Kok Thay – Malaysian billionaire, chairman & CEO of Genting Group
- Danny Lui – founder of Lenovo (ICL)
- Sir Deryck Maughan – CEO and chairman of Salomon Brothers (KCL)
- Eric Nicoli – CEO of EMI (KCL)
- Sir Ronald Norman (KCL)
- Jorma Ollila – former CEO of Nokia (LSE)
- Sir Edward Packard (KCL)
- David E. Potter – founder and chairman of Psion, chairman of Symbian (ICL)
- Tim Pryce – CEO of Terra Firma Capital Partners (KCL)
- Sir Ralph Robins (CEO of Rolls-Royce) (ICL)
- David Rockefeller – American billionaire and business tycoon (LSE)
- Sir Alliott Verdon Roe – founder of aircraft manufacturer Avro (KCL)
- Maurice Saatchi – founder of Saatchi and Saatchi (LSE)
- Isabel dos Santos – Africa's richest woman and its first female billionaire (KCL)
- Naveen Selvadurai – co-founder of Foursquare (KCL)
- George Soros – financial speculator and philanthropist (LSE)
- Stephen Bernard Streater – founder of Eidos (KCL)
- David Sullivan – billionaire businessman; media magnate, West Ham United football club owner (QMUL)
- Sir Richard Sykes – chairman of GlaxoSmithKline (KCL)
- Gary Tanaka – founder of Amerindo Investment Advisors (ICL)
- Sir David Tang – businessman and founder of Shanghai Tang fashion chain (KCL)
- Tony Wheeler – founder of Lonely Planet (LBS)
- Winston Wong – businessman (ICL)

== Economists ==
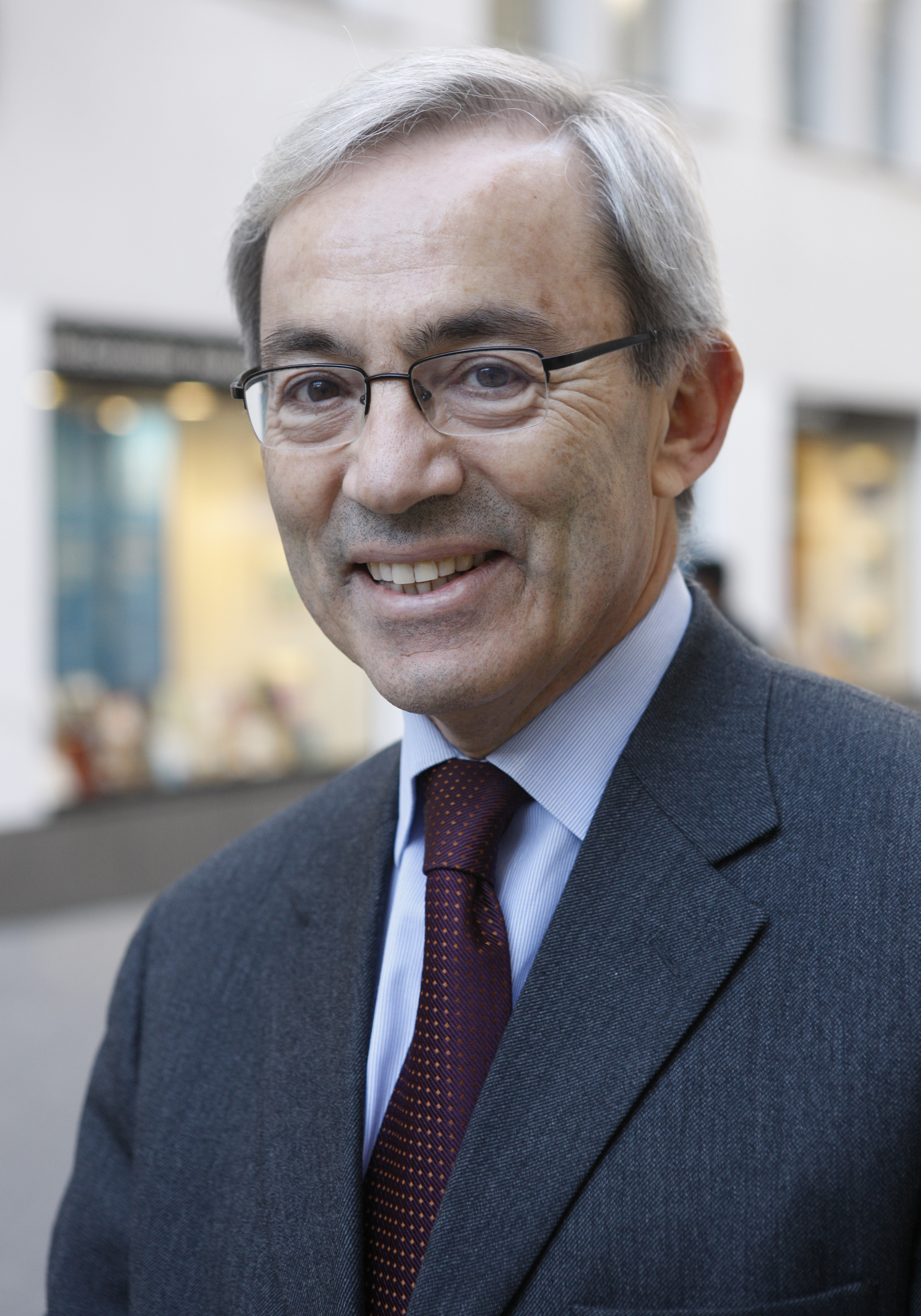
Christopher A. Pissarides, awarded the Nobel Prize in Economics in 2010 – currently Regius Professor of Economics at LSE

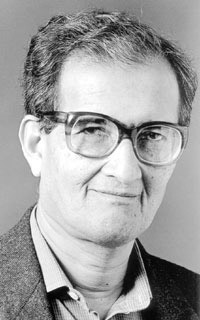
Amartya Sen, Indian economist, former professor and Nobel laureate

- George Akerlof (LSE)
- Sir Roy Allen (LSE)
- Kenneth Binmore (ICL)
- Ronald Coase (UOL & LSE)
- William Cunningham (KCL)
- Robert F. Engle III (LSE)
- Fred Harrison
- Friedrich von Hayek (LSE)
- James Heckman (UCL)
- Sir John Hicks (LSE)
- Leonid Hurwicz (LSE)
- William Stanley Jevons (UCL)
- Richard Jones (KCL)
- Charles Kennedy (ICL)
- Israel Kirzner (ULIP)
- Mervyn King (LSE)
- Paul Krugman (LSE)
- Sir Arthur Lewis (LSE)
- James Meade (LSE)
- Merton Miller (LSE)
- Robert Mundell (LSE)
- Mark Pennington (LSE & KCL)
- Christopher Pissarides (LSE)
- Lionel Robbins (LSE)
- Amartya Sen (LSE)
- Nicholas Stern (LSE)
- Sidney Webb, 1st Baron Passfield (BBK & KCL)
- Janet Yellen (LSE)

== Historians ==
- Ali M. Ansari (KCL)
- Sir Raymond Beazley (KCL)
- Antony Beevor (BBK)
- Matthew Bennett (KCL)
- Brian Bond (KCL)
- Asa Briggs, Baron Briggs (ULIP)
- David Cannadine (UL)
- Sir William Laird Clowes (KCL)
- Sebastian Cox (KCL)
- Paul Davis (KCL)
- Henri Dorra (KCL)
- Richard J. Evans (BBK)
- Orlando Figes (BBK)
- Katherine Elizabeth Fleming (KCL)
- Ian Gooderson (KCL)
- Andrew Gordon (KCL)
- Judith Green (KCL)
- Mark Grimsley (KCL)
- Eric Grove (KCL)
- Richard Grunberger (KCL)
- D. G. E. Hall (KCL)
- Christopher Harper-Bill (KCL)
- Eric Hobsbawm (BBK)
- David Irving (ICL)
- Robert Knecht (KCL)
- Amélie Kuhrt (KCL)
- Andrew Lambert (KCL)
- Bernard Lewis (SOAS)
- Jacob Mann
- Arnaldo Momigliano (UCL)
- Desmond Morton (LSE)
- Percy Newberry (KCL)
- Peter Paret (KCL)
- Sir Nikolaus Pevsner (BBK)
- Ben Pimlott (BBK)
- David Rohl (UCL)
- Conrad Russell (UCL)
- Philip Sabin (KCL)
- Ram Sharan Sharma – historian of Ancient India
- Gary Sheffield (KCL)
- Anne Somerset (KCL)
- Geoffrey Till (KCL)
- George Albert Wells (BBK)
- Colin White (KCL)
- Donald Wiseman (KCL)

== Journalists ==
- Anita Anand (KCL)
- Ruaridh Arrow (KCL)
- Martin Bashir (KCL)
- Cyril Kenneth Bird (KCL)
- Lisa Brennan-Jobs (KCL)
- Sana Bucha (KCL)
- Daniel Ford (KCL)
- Edward Greenspon (LSE)
- Sydney Jacobson, Baron Jacobson (KCL)
- Ellie Harrison (KCL)
- Bernard Levin (LSE)
- Michael Lewis (LSE)
- Sophie Long (KCL)
- Jonathan Maitland (KCL)
- Ira Mathur (KCL)
- Hargreaves Parkinson (KCL)
- Trevor Phillips (ICL)
- Chapman Pincher (KCL)
- Claire Rayner (KCL)
- Roger Royle (KCL)
- Richard Sambrook (BBK)
- John Sandes (KCL)
- Nicholas Stuart (KCL)
- Laurie Taylor (BBK)
- Xiao Qian (SOAS)

== Judges and lawyers ==
- Dixon Kwame Afreh – justice of the Supreme Court of Ghana (2002–2003) (UOL)
- Michael Ashikodi Agbamuche – Nigerian attorney general (KCkimL)
- Salahuddin Ahmad – attorney general of Bangladesh (LSE)
- Syed Ishtiaq Ahmed – former attorney general of Bangladesh (LSE)
- Bola Ajibola – judge of the International Court of Justice (UOL)
- Sir Harry Dias Bandaranaike – chief justice of the Supreme Court of Ceylon (KCL)
- Sir Harold Bollers – chief justice of Guyana (KCL)
- Kofi Adumua Bossman – justice of the Supreme Court of Ghana (KCL)
- Francis Chang-Sam – Seychellois attorney general (KCL)
- Sir Fielding Clarke – chief justice of Fiji, Hong Kong and Jamaica (KCL)
- Philippe Couvreur – registrar at the International Court of Justice (KCL)
- Sir Cyril Fountain – chief justice of The Bahamas (KCL)
- Brian Hayes – South Australian lawyer and former National Chairman of the Australia India Business Council
- Robert John Hayfron-Benjamin – Chief Justice of Botswana (1977–1981)
- Chukwunweike Idigbe – justice of the Supreme Court of Nigeria (KCL)
- K. C. Kamalasabayson – Sri Lankan attorney general (KCL)
- Karim Ahmad Khan – chief prosecutor of the International Criminal Court (KCL)
- Gilbert Walter King – judge of the British Supreme Court for China
- Sir Leonard Knowles – chief justice of the Bahamas (KCL)
- Gustav Koranteng-Addow – attorney general of Ghana (SOAS)
- Abdul Koroma – judge of the International Court of Justice (KCL)
- Mustafa Kamal – former chief justice of Bangladesh (LSE)
- Nii Ashie Kotey – Ghanaian academic and active justice of the Supreme Court of Ghana (2018–2023)
- Wayne Martin – former chief justice of Western Australia (KCL)
- Trevor Moniz – Bermudan attorney general (KCL)
- Betty Mould-Iddrisu – attorney general of Ghana (LSE)
- Babatunji Olowofoyeku – attorney general of Western Region, Nigeria (UOL)
- Janine Pritchard – justice of the Supreme Court of Western Australia
- Patrick Lipton Robinson – judge of the International Court of Justice (KCL)
- Shabtai Rosenne – international law professor and Israeli diplomat
- J. Sarkodee-Addo – chief justice of Ghana (KCL)
- Kobina Sekyi – Ghanaian lawyer, poet and politician
- Meir Shamgar – president/chief justice of the Israel Supreme Court (UOL)
- Choor Singh – judge of the Supreme Court of Singapore (UOL)
- John Taylor – chief justice of Lagos (KCL)
- Luka Martin Tomažič – Slovenian author and law professor (UOL)
- Sir Skinner Turner – chief judge of the British Supreme Court for China
- William Bedford Van Lare – Ghanaian jurist and diplomat, former justice of the Supreme Court of Ghana (UCL)
- Thomas Webb – Australian judge (KCL)
- Christopher Weeramantry – Sri Lankan lawyer and vice-president of the International Court of Justice (UOL)
- Sir Michael Whitley – Singaporean attorney general (KCL)
- Edward Williams – judge of the Supreme Court of Queensland, Australia (UOL)

=== Hong Kong ===
- Andrew Chan – judge of the Court of First Instance of the High Court (UOL)
- Teresa Cheng – Secretary for Justice (Hong Kong) (UOL)
- Peter Cheung – Justice of Appeal of the Court of Appeal of the High Court (UOL)
- Carlye Chu – vice president of the Court of Appeal of the High Court (LSE)
- Fielding Clarke – Chief Justice of the Supreme Court of Hong Kong (UOL & KCL)
- Joseph Fok – permanent judge of the Court of Final Appeal (UCL)
- Leslie Gibson – chief justice of the Supreme Court of Hong Kong (UOL)
- Meigh Goodman – chief justice of the Supreme Court of Hong Kong (UCL)
- Michael Hartmann – chairman of the Hong Kong Market Misconduct Tribunal and the Securities and Futures Appeals Tribunal and Non-Permanent Judge of the Court of Final Appeal of Hong Kong (UOL)
- Joseph Horsford Kemp – attorney general and chief justice of the Supreme Court of Hong Kong (UOL)
- Jeremy Poon – chief judge of the High Court (UCL)
- Roberto Ribeiro – permanent judge of the Court of Final Appeal (LSE)
- Michael David Thomas – Attorney General of Hong Kong (LSE)
- Woo Kwok-hing – vice-president of the Court of Appeal of the High Court (UCL)
- Yang Ti-liang – chief justice of the Supreme Court of Hong Kong (UCL)
- Maria Yuen – Justice of Appeal of the Court of Appeal of the High Court (UOL)

=== United Kingdom ===
- Dame Geraldine Andrews – Lady Justice of Appeal of the Court of Appeal of England and Wales (KCL)
- Sir Robin Auld – Lord Justice of Appeal (KCL)
- Sir Horace Avory – judge and criminal lawyer (KCL)
- Cherie Blair – barrister, wife of former British Prime Minister Tony Blair (LSE)
- William Brett, 1st Viscount Esher – Master of the Rolls (KCL)
- Sir Mackenzie Chalmers – judge and Parliamentary Counsel to the Treasury (KCL)
- Dame Bobbie Cheema-Grubb – High Court Judge (KCL)
- Edmund Davies, Baron Edmund-Davies – Lord Justice of Appeal and Law Lord (KCL)
- Albert Venn Dicey – English jurist (ICL)
- Sir David Foskett – High Court judge (KCL)
- Sir George Jessel – English jurist (UCL)
- Neil Kaplan – judge and arbitrator (KCL)
- Frances Kirkham – judge (KCL)
- George Leggatt, Lord Leggatt – Justice of the Supreme Court of the United Kingdom (CITY)
- Sir David Penry-Davey – High Court judge (KCL)
- Jenny Rowe – chief executive of the Supreme Court of the United Kingdom (KCL)
- Gordon Slynn, Baron Slynn of Hadley – Lord of Appeal in Ordinary (GCUL)
- Harry Woolf, Baron Woolf – Lord Chief Justice of England and Wales (UCL)

=== United States ===
- Sylvia Bacon – associate judge of the Superior Court of the District of Columbia (LSE)
- Pasco Bowman II – senior United States circuit judge of the United States Court of Appeals for the Eighth Circuit (LSE)
- Michael Chertoff – former United States circuit judge of the United States Court of Appeals for the Third Circuit and Secretary of the United States Department of Homeland Security (LSE)
- Suzanne B. Conlon – senior judge of the United States District Court for the Northern District of Illinois (UOL)
- Colm Connolly – chief judge of the United States District Court for the District of Delaware (LSE)
- Nina Gershon – senior judge of the United States District Court for the Eastern District of New York (LSE)
- Terence Hallinan – former District Attorney of San Francisco and Former Member of the San Francisco Board of Supervisors (LSE)
- Anthony Kennedy – associate justice of the Supreme Court of the United States (LSE)
- David S. Leibowitz – U.S. district judge of the United States District Court for the Southern District of Florida (LSE)
- Lewis J. Liman – U.S. district judge of the United States District Court for the Southern District of New York (LSE)
- D. Price Marshall Jr. – chief judge of the United States District Court for the Eastern District of Arkansas (LSE)
- Thomas Mesereau – defence attorney (LSE)
- Janet Napolitano – former secretary of the United States Department of Homeland Security, governor of Arizona, and attorney general of Arizona (LSE)
- Thomas Newman O'Neill Jr. – senior judge of the United States District Court for the Eastern District of Pennsylvania (LSE)
- Ilana Rovner – senior United States circuit judge of the United States Court of Appeals for the Seventh Circuit (KCL)
- Frederic N. Smalkin – former chief judge of the United States District Court for the District of Maryland (UOL)
- Joseph Tyree Sneed III – Senior United States circuit judge of the United States Court of Appeals for the Ninth Circuit and Deputy Attorney General (LSE)
- Raúl Torrez – Attorney General of New Mexico (LSE)
- Dale Wainwright – former associate justice of the Texas Supreme Court (LSE)
- Kimba Wood – senior judge of the United States District Court for the Southern District of New York (LSE)
- John A. Woodcock Jr. – senior judge of the United States District Court for the District of Maine (LSE)

== Philosophers ==
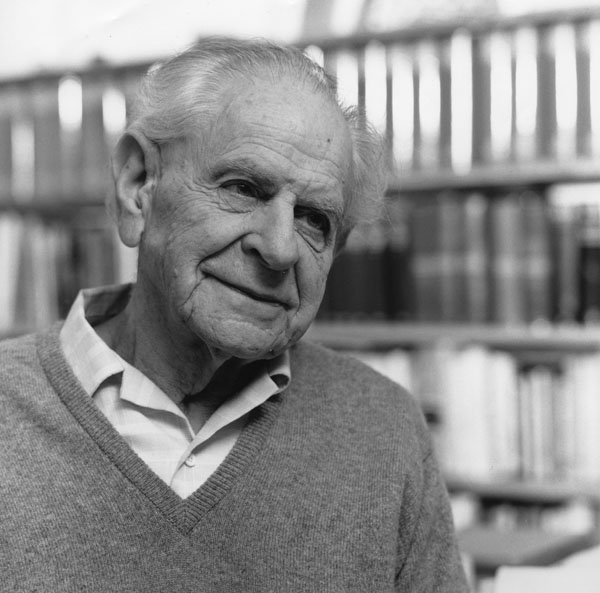
Karl Popper, reader in logic and scientific method

- A. J. Ayer (UCL)
- William Warren Bartley (LSE)
- Helen Beebee (KCL)
- Nick Bostrom (LSE)
- Harry Brighouse (KCL)
- Elizabeth Burns (KCL)
- Nancy Cartwright (LSE)
- Brian Davies (KCL)
- Daniel Dennett (LSE)
- Paul Feyerabend (LSE)
- Raimond Gaita (KCL)
- Ernest Gellner (LSE)
- Jonathan Glover (KCL)
- John Gray (LSE)
- A. C. Grayling (BBK)
- C. E. M. Joad (BBK)
- Imre Lakatos (LSE)
- Alasdair MacIntyre (QMUL)
- David Miller (LSE)
- Alan Musgrave (LSE)
- Michael Oakeshott (LSE)
- Sir Karl Popper (LSE)
- Stathis Psillos (KCL)
- John Ralston Saul (KCL)
- Simon Saunders (KCL)
- Syed Muhammad Naquib al-Attas (SOAS)
- Bertrand Russell (LSE)
- Mark Sainsbury (KCL)
- Roger Scruton (BBK)
- Jeremy Shearmur (LSE)
- Elliott Sober (LSE)
- Nicla Vassallo (KCL)
- Sir Ralph Wedgwood, 4th Baronet (KCL)

== Sportspersons ==
- Jo Ankier athlete (KCL)
- Dina Asher-Smith – Olympic winning athlete (KCL)
- Louis Attrill – Olympic gold medallist, rowing (ICL)
- Roger Bannister – first to run the four-minute mile (ICL)
- Paul Bennett – Olympic gold medal-winning rower (KCL)
- Simon Dennis – Olympic gold medallist, rowing (ICL)
- Harry Gem – inventor of lawn tennis (KCL)
- Katherine Grainger – Olympic gold medalist, rowing (KCL)
- Frances Houghton – Olympic medal-winning rower (KCL)
- Thomas Hollingdale – Welsh international rugby player (KCL)
- Adam Khan – racing driver (KCL)
- Corinna Lawrence – fencer (KCL)
- Zoe Lee – Olympic medal-winning rower (KCL)
- Hugh Lindsay – English amateur footballer who played for Southampton and appeared in the 1960 Summer Olympics
- Gary Lineker – England footballer and television pundit (KCL)
- Edward Pegge – Welsh international rugby player (KCL)
- Leigh Richmond Roose – Welsh international footballer (KCL)
- Chris Sheasby – England rugby player (KCL)
- Annabel Vernon – Olympic medal-winning rower (KCL)
- Kieran West – Olympic gold medallist, rowing (KCL)

== Others ==
- Abdalla Uba Adamu – professor, media scholar, vice chancellor, National Open University of Nigeria
- Thomas Armitage – founder of the RNIB (KCL)
- James Barrett – Australian ophthalmologist and academic administrator (KCL)
- Thomas John Barnardo – philanthropist (QMUL) (Note: Attended London Hospital; did not graduate.)
- Hedley Bull – International Relations academic (LSE)
- Sir William Coxen, 1st Baronet – Lord Mayor of London (KCL)
- Satyabrata Rai Chowdhuri – Indian political scientist (LSE) (SAS)
- James Cuno – director of the Courtauld Institute of Art (2003–2004)
- Sir Christopher Geidt – Private Secretary to Queen Elizabeth II (KCL)
- Harry Golombek – chess grandmaster (KCL)
- Michael Halliday – linguist
- Harold Jenkins – Shakespeare scholar
- Reginald Johnston – teacher of Puyi (SOAS)
- Sir Ivison Macadam – first president of NUS and director-general of Chatham House (KCL)
- David Livingstone – explorer (ICL)
- Ram Charan Mehrotra – vice chancellor of the University of Delhi and University of Allahabad
- Linda Norgrove – kidnapped by the Taliban in Afghanistan, and killed in rescue effort
- Lindsay Riddoch (1993–2017) – mental health activist
- Ilich Ramírez Sánchez – criminal and terrorist (LSE)
- José Graziano da Silva – agronomist, director general of the Food and Agriculture Organization (ILAS)
- Sir Francis Wyatt Truscott – Lord Mayor of London (KCL)
- Arthur Christopher Watson – British High Commissioner to Brunei
- Marianne Winder – linguist, author, Buddhist and librarian at the Wellcome Library

== Honorary degrees ==
The University of London presented its first honorary degrees in June 1903. This accolade has been bestowed on several members of British royal family and a wide range of distinguished individuals from both the academic and non-academic worlds. Honorary degrees are approved by the Collegiate Council, part of the university's governance structure.

- George V (Hon. 1903) – King of the United Kingdom and the British Dominions and Emperor of India
- Edward VIII (Hon. M.Com. 1921, D.Sc. 1921) – King of the United Kingdom and the British Dominions and Emperor of India
- Queen Elizabeth the Queen Mother (Hon. D.Litt. 1937) – Queen consort of the United Kingdom and the British Dominions (Note: See List of titles and honours of Queen Elizabeth the Queen Mother)
- Princess Alice, Countess of Athlone (1933) – member of the British royal family (Note: The University of London awarded honorary doctorate degree to Princess Alice at the Foundation Day ceremony on 18 November 1933.)
- Queen Elizabeth II (Hon. BMus, Hon. LLD) – Queen of the United Kingdom and the other Commonwealth realms (Note: See List of titles and honours of Elizabeth II)
- Prince Philip, Duke of Edinburgh (Hon. LLD) (Note: See List of titles and honours of Prince Philip, Duke of Edinburgh) – Consort of the British monarch
- Princess Margaret (Hon. D.Mus. 1957) – member of British royal family
- Albert Einstein (1936) – theoretical physicist and recipient of Nobel Prize in Physics in 1921
- Alexander Fleming (1948) – recipient of Nobel Prize in Medicine in 1945
- René Cassin (1969) – recipient of Nobel Peace Prize in 1968
- Amartya Sen (DSc Econ 2000) – recipient of Nobel Prize in Economics 1998
- Lars Ahlfors (1978) – Finnish mathematician Recipient of Fields Medal in 1936.
- Franklin D. Roosevelt (1941; conferred in 1945) – 32nd president of the United States
- Winston Churchill (Hon. LLD 1948) – prime minister of the United Kingdom (Note: The University of London awarded honorary doctorate degree to Winston Churchill at the Foundation Day ceremony on 18 November 1948.)
- Stanley Baldwin (1933) – prime minister of the United Kingdom (Note: The University of London awarded honorary doctorate degree to Stanley Baldwin at the Foundation Day ceremony on 18 November 1933.)
- Helena Kennedy (2015) – principal of Mansfield College, Oxford
- John Beddington (2015) – UK Government Chief Scientific Adviser
- Rolph Payet (Hon. D.Sc. 2016) – United Nations Executive Secretary for the Basel, Rotterdam and Stockholm Convention
- Cosmo Gordon Lang (1933) – Archbishop of Canterbury (1928–1942)
- Eliza Manningham-Buller (2019) – Director General of MI5 (2002 to 2007)
- Jack Higgins – British writer
- David Cannadine (Hon. D.Litt. 2017) – president of the British Academy
- Sue Black (Hon. D.Sc. 2018) – pro vice-chancellor at Lancaster University
- Kumar Mangalam Birla (Hon. DSc Econ 2025), billionaire
