= Khalaf Masa'deh =

Jordanian politician and lawyer

Minister of Justice
- In office 15 January 2000 – 18 June 2000
- Monarch: Abdullah II of Jordan
- Prime Minister: Abdelraouf Rawabdeh
- Preceded by: Hamza Haddad
- Succeeded by: Faris Nabulsi

Personal details
- Died: 19 February 2015
- Children: Ahmad Masa'deh

Khalaf Masa'deh (died 19 February 2015) was a Jordanian politician and prominent lawyer. He served as Minister of Justice from 15 January 2000 to 18 June 2000. He founded the law firm Khalaf Masa'deh & Partners in 1968. He was the father of Ahmad Masa'deh.
