= Muhammad Ali Ja'abari =

Palestinian politician

Sheikh Muhammad Ali Ja'abari 1
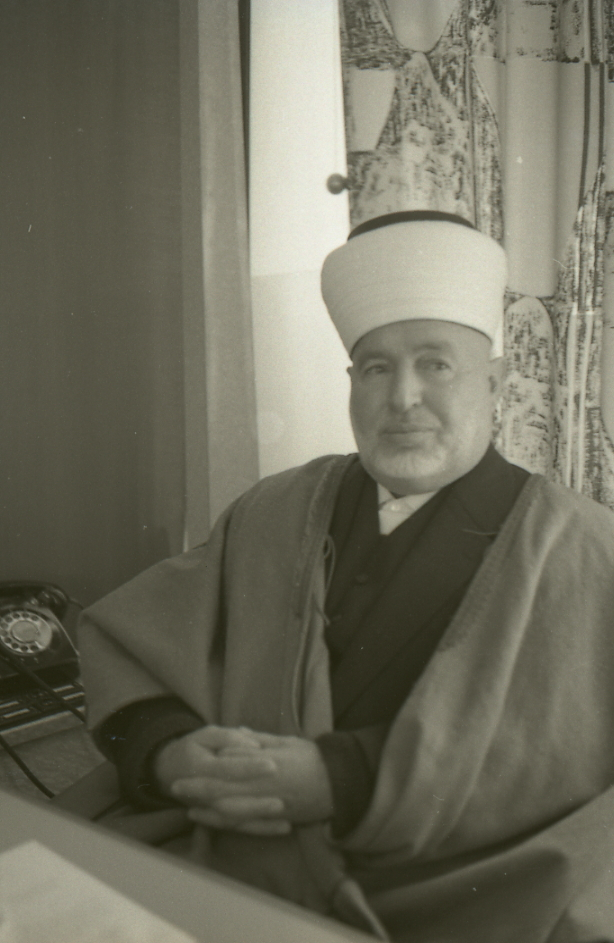
- Muhammad Ali Ja'abari, 1968

Mayor of Hebron
- In office 1948–1976
- Succeeded by: Fahd Qawasmi

Member of the upper chamber of the Jordanian government
- Incumbent
- Assumed office 1950s

Member of various Jordanian cabinets
- In office 1970s–?

Personal details
- Born: 1900
- Died: 1980 (aged 79–80)
- Relations: Sulaiman Ja'abari (relative)

Sheikh Muhammad Ali Ja'abari (Arabic: الشيخ محمد علي الجعبري 1900–1980) was the long-serving mayor of the Palestinian city of Hebron, appointed by Jordan, from 1948 to 1976. Ja'abari was head of the Jericho Conference in Jericho which supported the unification of the West Bank and Jordan. In the 1950s, he held a seat in the upper chamber of the Jordanian government.

== Career ==
Sheikh Muhammad ali Ja'abari represented Hebron at the Fourth Conference of the Arab Mayors of Palestine in 1945, hosted in Gaza.

After Israel occupied the West Bank from Jordan in the 1967 Six-Day War, he proposed that Israel only remain in power for five years after which the Palestinians would reserve the right of self-determination. Apparently, it had been agreed with Israel that he would serve as the Prime Minister of a new Palestinian state. He prominently opposed the violent nature of the fedayeen. His tenure as mayor of Jordan ended on 28 March 1976, and he was succeeded by Fahd Qawasmi who was the first elected mayor of the city. Throughout the 1970s, Ja'abari was member of various Jordanian cabinets, and held the portfolio of Minister of Justice in 1955, 1958, 1959 and 1960-1961. Ja'abari died in 1980. He is related to Sulaiman Ja'abari, the former Grand Mufti of Jerusalem.
