= Ahmad Masa'deh =

Jordanian politician, diplomat and lawyer

Ahmad K. Masa'deh

Ahmad Khalaf Masa'deh (Arabic: أحمد خلف مساعده) (born 19 May 1969) is a Jordanian politician, diplomat and lawyer.

Ahmad Masa'deh was the Minister for Public Sector Reform (2004–2005) and Jordan's Ambassador to the European Union, Belgium, Norway, Luxembourg and NATO (2006–2010). Dr. Masa'deh was elected as the 1st Secretary General of the Union for the Mediterranean (2010 to 2011). His father is Khalaf Masa'deh, a former Jordanian Minister of Justice and one of the leading lawyers. Ahmad Masa'deh received his legal education at the University of Jordan (LLB, 1991), the University of Virginia (LLM, 1992), and King's College London (PhD, 2000). He is admitted to the Jordan Bar Association since 1993 and a practicing corporate and arbitration lawyer and the Managing Partner of Khalaf Masa'deh LLC Attorneys & Counsellors since 2012.
