= Bassam Talhouni =

Jordanian lawyer, academic and politician

His Excellency Bassam Talhouni
- بسام التلهوني
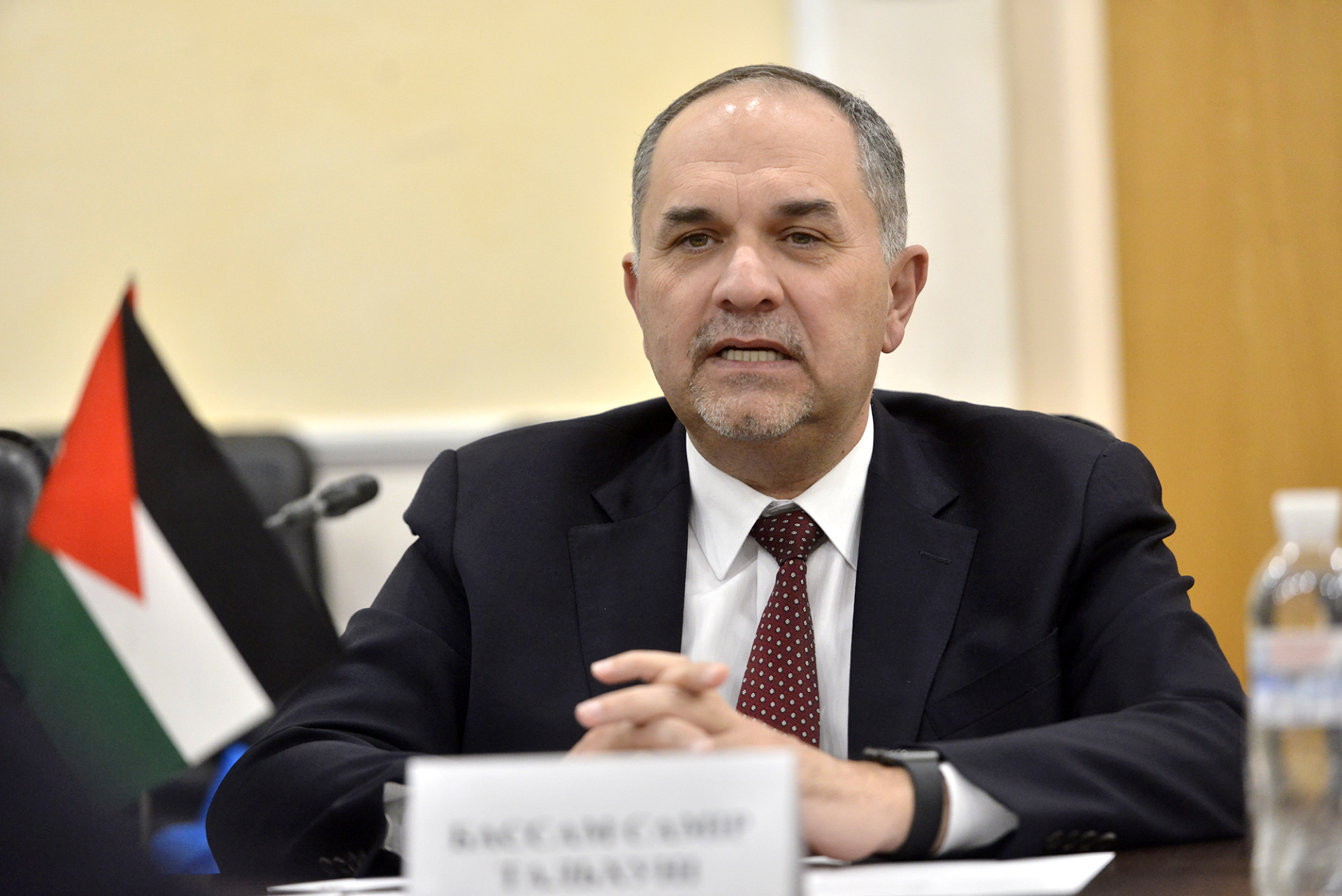
- Talhouni in 2019

Minister of Justice
- Incumbent
- Assumed office 18 September 2024
- Monarch: Abdullah II of Jordan
- Prime Minister: Jafar Hassan
- Preceded by: Ahmad Ziadat
- In office August 2013 – September 2016
- Monarch: Abdullah II of Jordan
- Prime Minister: Abdullah Ensour; Hani Al-Mulki
- Preceded by: Ahmad Ziadat
- Succeeded by: Awad Mashagbeh

Senator in the Parliament of Jordan
- In office August 2013 – 29 September 2016
- Monarch: Abdullah II of Jordan
- Prime Minister: Abdullah Ensour; Hani Al-Mulki
- Preceded by: Ahmad Ziadat
- Succeeded by: Awad Abu Jarad

Personal details
- Born: 1964 (age 61–62) Amman
- Party: Independent
- Education: University of Jordan; University of Edinburgh

Bassam Talhouni (Arabic: بسام التلهوني; born 1964) is the Jordanian Minister of Justice. He is a lawyer, academic and politician. He had served as industry minister.

Previously, Talhouni served as minister of justice in Bisher Al-Khasawneh's cabinet. He resigned with Samir Mobeideen on 28 February 2021 due to breaking lockdown in the COVID-19 pandemic in Jordan.

== Early life and education ==
Talhouni was born in Amman in 1964. He received a bachelor's degree and a master's degree in law from the University of Jordan. He also holds a PhD in law from the University of Edinburgh which he obtained in 1997.

== Career ==
Talhouni registered at the Jordan Bar Association in 1988 and owns a law firm in Amman. He was assistant professor at the University of Jordan's law faculty. He served as a member in the legislation and justice branch within the national agenda committee and companies' comptroller. He is a member of the Arab Society for Intellectual Property (ASIP).

In August 2013, he was appointed justice minister to the cabinet led by Prime Minister Abdullah Ensour. He stayed on in Hani Al-Mulki's cabinet presented in June 2016. He lost his position in the cabinet reshuffle on 29 September 2016, and was replaced by Awad Mashagbeh. Talhouni was subsequently appointed to the Senate.

On 18 September 2024, he was appointed as Minister of Justice.
