= Khalifah Suleiman =

Minister of Justice
- In office 2 May 2012 – 11 October 2012
- Monarch: King Abdullah II
- Prime Minister: Fayez Tarawneh
- Preceded by: Salim Al Zoubi
- Succeeded by: Ghaleb Zubi

Personal details
- Born: 1953 (age 72–73)
- Education: University of Jordan

Khalifah Khaled Suleiman (born 1953) is a Jordanian jurist and politician who briefly served as Minister of Justice from May to October 2012.

== Early life and education ==
Suleiman was born in 1953. He obtained a master's degree in law from the University of Jordan.

== Career ==
Suleiman worked at different positions in the Jordanian judiciary system beginning in 1981. His previous posts include vice president of the cassation court and general prosecutor. He was appointed justice minister to the cabinet headed by Fayez Tarawneh on 2 May 2012. He replaced Salim Al Zoubi. Khalifah's term lasted until October 2012 and he was replaced by Ghaleb Zubi. Khalifah was appointed president of the Higher Court of Justice in November 2012.
