= Ghaleb Zu'bi =

Jordanian lawyer and politician

Minister of Justice
- In office 11 October 2012 – 30 March 2013
- Monarch: King Abdullah II
- Prime Minister: Abdullah Ensour
- Preceded by: Khalifah Suleiman
- Succeeded by: Ahmad Ziadat

Minister of Interior
- In office May 2012 – 11 October 2012
- Prime Minister: Hani Al-Mulki
- Preceded by: Salameh Hammad

Minister of Interior
- In office 15 January 2017 – 25 February 2018
- Succeeded by: Sameer Mubaidin

Personal details
- Born: 1943 (age 82–83) Salt, Jordan
- Education: Damascus University

Ghaleb Zu'bi (born 1943) is a Jordanian lawyer and politician who served in different post at the various cabinets of the Hashemite Kingdom of Jordan. Zu'bi was appointed minister of interior by Prime Minister Hani Al-Mulki on 15 January 2017 and served in the post until 25 February 2018.

== Early life and education ==
Zu'bi was born in Salt in 1943. He hails from one of the Jordan's largest tribes in Salt city. He obtained a bachelor's degree in law from Damascus University in 1967. He also holds a master's degree in law, which he received in Egypt in 1981.

== Career ==
After working as a lawyer, Zu'bi joined politics. He served as director of the anti-narcotics department, the Amman police department, and assistant director of the public security department. Next, he served as member of parliament for two terms, from 1997 to 2001 and from 2003 to 2007. He was a deputy for East Bank, the first district of Balqa. During his term, he served as head of the legal committee in the lower house for eight years. His first cabinet post was the minister of state for parliamentary affairs and he was appointed to the cabinet led by Prime Minister Nader Dahabi in a reshuffle on 23 February 2009.

In May 2012, Zu'bi was appointed interior minister to the second cabinet of Prime Minister Fayez Tarawneh, replacing Mohammad Al Raoud. Zu'bi's term as interior minister lasted until 11 October 2012 when he was appointed Minister of Justice to the cabinet headed by Prime Minister Abdullah Ensour. On 30 March 2013, Zu'bi was replaced by Ahmad Ziadat as justice minister. On 15 January 2017, Zu'bi replaced Salameh Hammad in a government reshuffle. Zu'bi served until 25 February 2018.
