= Darren Dalcher =

British engineer

Darren Dalcher is a British engineer and senior academic. He is Professor in Strategic Project Management at Lancaster University Management School and Director of the National Centre for Project Management (NCPM) in the UK.

== Early life ==
He earned a PhD in Software Engineering from King's College London.

== Career ==
He is involved in organising international conferences, and has delivered many keynote addresses and tutorials, including PMexpo, BIS conference and others. He is Editor-in-Chief of the Journal of Software: Evolution and Process, and Editor of Routledge Frontiers in Project Management. He is the Academic Advisor and Editor of the APM Body of Knowledge, 7th Edition.

== Honours ==
- Honorary Fellow of the Association for Project Management, awarded for outstanding contributions to the practice and discipline of project management
- Chartered Fellow, British Computer Society
- Chartered IT Professional (CITP)
- Fellow, Chartered Management Institute
- Fellow, Royal Society of Arts
- Professional Member, Institute for Systems Engineering
- Senior Member, IEEE
- Senior Fellow, Higher Education Academy
- Member, INCOSE
- Member, Project Management Institute
- Member, Academy of Management
- Member, Institute for Electrical and Electronics Engineers,
- Member, Association for Computing Machinery.
- Member of the PMI Advisory Board responsible for the David I. Cleland project management award and of the APM Professional Development Board.
- Named Academic of the Year by Project magazine,
- Named one of the top 10 "movers and shapers" in project management by the Association for Project Management
- Named one of the five leading thinkers in project management and global development, bridging the gap between academic theory and real-world project execution, by the Nation

== Published books ==
- Successful IT Projects, Thomson Learning, 2007.
- Advances in Project Management: Narrated Journeys in Uncharted Territory, Routledge, 2016.
- Further Advances in Project Management: Guided Exploration in Unfamiliar Landscapes, Routledge, 2017.
- The Evolution of Project Management Practice: From Programmes and Contracts to Benefits and Change, Routledge, 2017.
- Managing Projects in a World of People, Strategy and Change, Routledge, 2018.
- APM Body of Knowledge, 7th Edition, Association for Project Management, 2018.
- Leading the Project Revolution: Reframing the Human Dynamics of Successful Projects, Routledge, 2019.
- APM Body of Knowledge, Revised 7th Edition, Association for Project Management, 2022.
- Rethinking Project Management for a Dynamic and Digital World, Routledge, 2022.
- Getting Started with Tech Ethics: An introduction to ethics and ethical behaviours for IT professionals, BCS: The Chartered Institute for IT, 2025.
