= David Edgar Cartwright =

British oceanographer (1926–2015)

David Edgar Cartwright FRS
- Born: Edgar David Beverley Cartwright; 21 October 1926; Stoke Newington, London, England
- Died: 2 December 2015 (aged 89); West Sussex, England
- Occupation: Oceanographer

David Edgar Cartwright FRS (1 October 1926 – 2 December 2015) was a British oceanographer.

== Biography ==
Cartwright was born Edgar David Beverley Cartwright on 21 October 1926 in Stoke Newington, London. His father, Edgar Athelstan Canynge Cartwright ran a detective agency, while his mother Lucienne Eugenie Taranson was a schoolteacher and pianist from France. The family moved to Worthing in Sussex when Cartwright was two and took over a hotel. After primary school he attended Worthing High School for Boys

In 1944, he started his higher education at St John's College, Cambridge (BA in natural science and electronics) and in 1949, he enrolled King's College London (BSc; DSc). After graduating in 1951, he started working at Department of Naval Construction. The following year, he married Anne-Marie Guerin, who he had met at his parents' hotel. The couple would go on to have four children, two daughters and two sons.

Cartwright was made a Fellow of the Royal Society in 1984 He was also a Fellow of the Royal Astronomical Society and the American Geophysical Union. Cartwright died in West Sussex on 2 December 2015.

== Works ==
Between 1954 and 1973, Cartwright worked for the National Institute of Oceanography, where he focused on problems related to sea waves, as well as work on the statistics of wave heights which would be used in the design off-shore oil rigs.

In 1974, he was appointed head of Institute of Oceanographic Sciences, overseeing research groups. He retired from Bidston in 1986, and worked for a few years at Goddard Space Flight Center, before acting as a NASA consultant in the early 1990s. He published Tides - a Scientific History in 1999, as well as approximately eighty papers on marine science during his career.
