= Ahmad Ziadat =

Jordanian politician (born 1950)

Minister of Justice
- In office 7 May 2021 – 18 September 2024
- Monarch: Abdullah II of Jordan
- Prime Minister: Bisher Al-Khasawneh
- Preceded by: Awad Abdul Bakhit Abu Jarad Al-Mashkaba
- Succeeded by: Bassam Talhouni
- In office 2013–2013
- Prime Minister: Abdullah Ensour
- Preceded by: Ghaleb Zu'bi
- Succeeded by: Bassam Talhouni

Minister of State for Legal Affairs
- In office 12 October 2020 – 7 May 2021
- Prime Minister: Bisher Al-Khasawneh
- Succeeded by: Mahmoud Kharabsheh

Personal details
- Born: Ahmad Nouri Ziadat; 1950 (age 75–76) As-Salt, Jordan
- Education: Harvard University (LL.M.); University of London (LL.D.)

Ahmad Nouri Ziadat (Arabic: أحمد نوري محمد الزيادات; born 1950) is a Jordanian politician. He was Minister of Justice from 7 May 2021 until 18 September 2024. Previously he had served as Minister of State for Legal Affairs since 12 October 2020 in Bisher Al-Khasawneh's Cabinet led by Prime Minister Bisher Al-Khasawneh.

== Education ==
Ziadat holds a Bachelor of Law (1983) from the University of Jordan, a Master of Laws (1985) from the Harvard University and a Doctor of Law (1989) from the University of London.

== Career ==
From 1983 until 1984, Ziadat was a research and teaching assistant at the University of Jordan. Between 1990 and 2003, he worked as an assistant professor at the University of Jordan and as a part-time lecturer at the Institute of Banking Studies, Al-Ahliyya Amman University and Al-Bayt University.

In 2003, he was named associate professor at the University of Jordan, and additionally served as the Dean of the Faculty of Law until 2005.

In 2016, Ziadat was appointed Minister of State for Prime Ministry Affairs.

From 2020 until 2021, he served as Minister of State for Legal Affairs.

Between 7 May 2021 until 18 September 2024, Ziadat had been the Minister of Justice.
