= Madeline Munro =

English geologist and educator (1885–1974)

Madeline Munro (1885–1974) was a British geologist, science educator and film reviewer.

== Biography ==
Munro trained as a palaeontologist under Edmund Johnston Garwood and graduated with a degree in geology from the University of London in 1907. In 1912, she published an appendix on the rare trepostome bryozoan stenophragmidium to one of Garwood's papers "The Lower Carboniferous Succession in the North-West of England" in the Quarterly Journal of the Geological Society. Her work was titled "Description of some new forms of Trepostome Bryozoa from the Lower Carboniferous rocks of the North Western province." In 1930, Munro was elected as a fellow of the Geological Society of London.

Munro also sat on the science committee of the British Film Institute and wrote reviews of scientific films for the Monthly Film Bulletin periodical. She was consulted during the production of school broadcasts in nature study and science by the BBC.
