= Cyril Wiseman Herbert =

English painter

Cyril Wiseman Herbert (1847–1882), was an English painter.

Herbert was the youngest son of John Rogers Herbert, R.A. He was born in Gloucester Road, Old Brompton, London, on 30 September 1847. He was the godson of Cardinal Wiseman, and was educated at St. Mary's College, Oscott, and King's College, London. Trained like his brothers in his father's studio, he visited Italy in 1868, where he made many elaborate sketches, chiefly among the mountains in the neighbourhood of Olevano. His first picture,‘Homeward after Labour,’ representing Roman cattle driven home after the day's toil, was exhibited at the Royal Academy in 1870.

The next year he sent ‘An Idyll;’ in 1873, ‘On the Hill-tops:’ and in 1874, ‘Returning to the Fold,’ Welsh sheep driven home in the gloaming, which was purchased by Sir Andrew Walker and presented to the Walker Art Gallery at Liverpool. He exhibited at the Royal Academy for the last time in 1875, when he sent ‘Escaped Home,’ a collie dog returning to its mistress at a cottage door. Besides these he painted ‘The Knight's Farewell’ and some other works which were never exhibited. Early in 1882 he was appointed curator of the antique school in the Royal Academy, but he died prematurely at the Chimes, Kilburn, on 2 July 1882. His remains were placed in the catacombs of St. Mary's Catholic cemetery, Kensal Green.
