= Ulrike Schmidt =

Psychiatrist

Ulrike Hermine Schmidt OBE
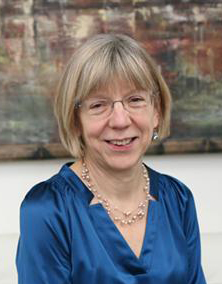
- Education: University of Düsseldorf
- Occupation: Psychiatrist
- Employer: King's College London
- Known for: Research and treatment of eating disorders
- Title: Professor of Eating Disorders

Ulrike Hermine Schmidt OBE is a British psychiatrist at the Institute of Psychiatry, Psychology and Neuroscience, King's College London in London, where she is Professor of Eating Disorders as well as the Head of the Section of Eating Disorders. Schmidt is a consultant at the Eating Disorders Service within the South London and Maudsley NHS Foundation Trust. Schmidt is known for her ground breaking work helping people with eating disorders and their clinicians.

== Career ==
Schmidt undertook her medical studies at the University of Düsseldorf. After graduation she went on to train in psychiatry at the Maudsley Hospital in London and became a consultant in community and liaison psychiatry at St. Mary's Hospital. She has been a consultant in the Eating Disorders Service at the Maudsley Hospital since 1998 and a professor of eating disorders at the Institute of Psychiatry, Psychology and Neuroscience at King's College London since 2006.

In her role as consultant at the South London and Maudsley NHS Foundation Trust, Schmidt is in charge of the Maudsley Hospital eating disorders service out-patient program, which assesses and treats patients with eating disorders.

In her role as researcher at the Institute of Psychiatry, Psychology and Neuroscience, Schmidt's research into eating disorders focuses on brief psychological treatments and self-help, as well as treatment of self-harm and diabetes. Schmidt has also done extensive work on the use of new technologies in the treatment of eating disorders using online computer based interventions.

Schmidt also fulfils a number of other roles, including chair of the Section of Eating Disorders at the Royal College of Psychiatrists and also chair of the Academy for Eating Disorders.

== Honours and recognition ==
Schmidt has won a National Health Service Innovation Award for the development of a computer based self-help intervention for people with anorexia nervosa and their carers. She was also a recipient of the King's College London Graduate School Supervisory Excellence Awards for 2012-13 Schmidt's work has also been highlighted in a Lancet profile on the King's College London Eating Disorders Unit in early 2013. She was elected a Fellow of the Academy of Medical Sciences in 2023.

Schmidt was appointed Officer of the Order of the British Empire (OBE) in the 2024 New Year Honours for services to people with eating disorders.

== Publications ==
Schmidt is a prolific researcher and has published over 160 papers, all of which can be accessed using the King's College London Research Portal - PURE.
