= Max Coleman (geoscientist) =

British geoscientist

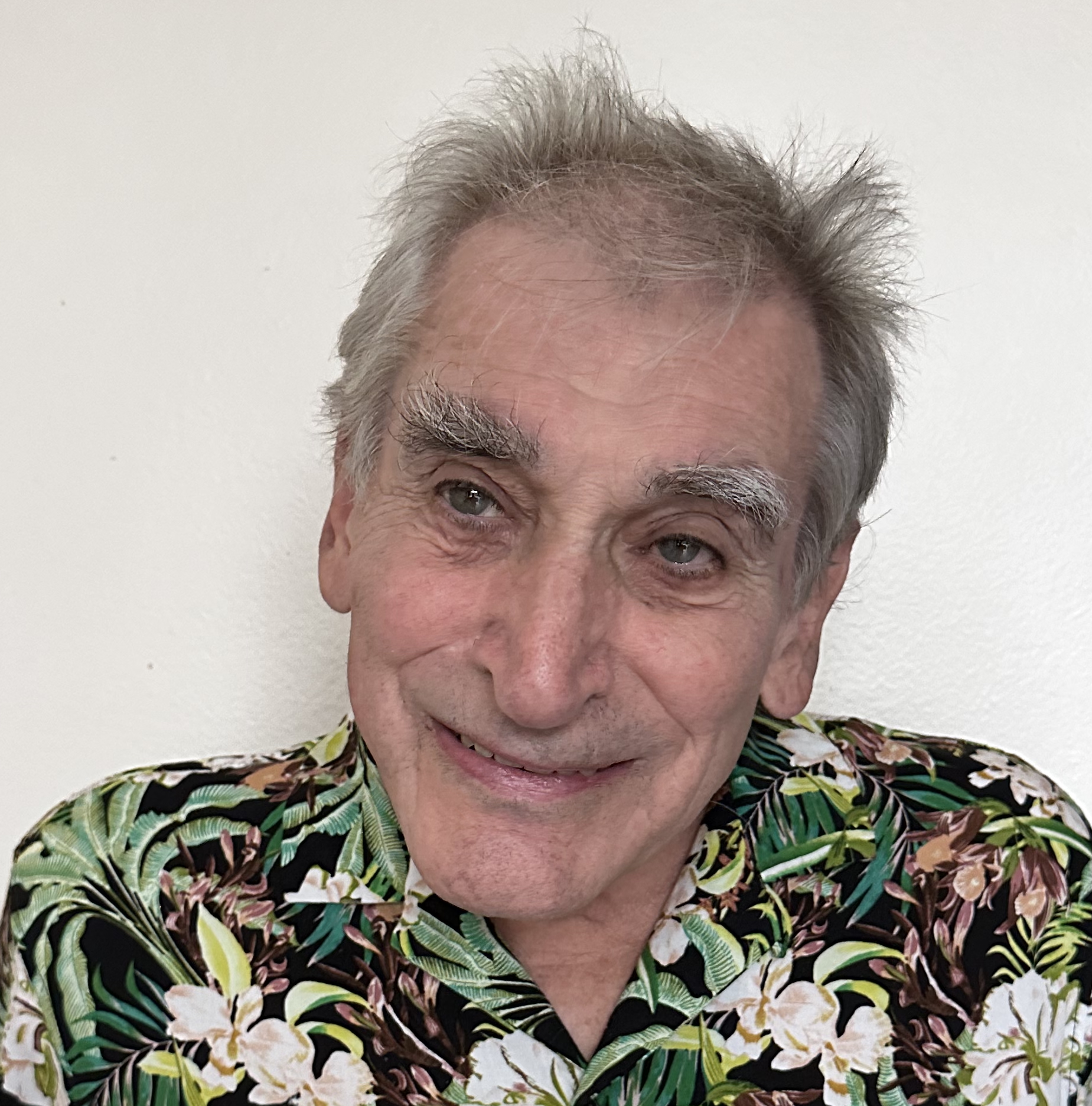
- Occupations: Geoscientist and academic

Academic background
- Education: B.Sc., Geology and Chemistry; M.Sc., Geochemistry; Ph.D., Isotope Geochemistry
- Alma mater: University of London; University of Leeds

Academic work
- Institutions: University of Reading

Max Coleman is a geoscientist and academic. He is a scientist at NASA Jet Propulsion Laboratory as well as an Emeritus Professor of Sedimentology at the University of Reading.

Coleman's research interests include molecular and microbial biology, chemical and biological oceanography, isotope analysis, paleoceanography, astrobiology, and geochemistry. He is one of the founding members of the European Geosciences Union and was awarded the Prestwich Medal in 2014.

== Education ==
Coleman received a B.Sc. in Geology and Chemistry from the University of London in 1966, followed by a M.Sc. in Geochemistry from the University of Leeds in 1967. He completed his Ph.D. in isotope geochemistry at Leeds in 1970.

== Career ==
Coleman served as an adjunct professor at the University of Reading from 1988 to 1995, before being promoted to professor in 1995, a position he held until 2005. He was later appointed emeritus professor at Reading. Since 2013, he has also been a visiting associate in Geochemistry at the Division of Geological and Planetary Sciences at the California Institute of Technology.

As a geoscientist, Coleman was head of the NERC Stable Isotope Facility at the British Geological Survey from 1973 to 1983. He subsequently worked at the BP Research Centre as head of the Inorganic Geochemistry Group, Manager of the Geochemistry Branch, and Coordinator of Exploration Corporate Research (1983–1992). From 1992 to 1995, he was manager of long-term research and coordinator of Exploration University Liaison at BP Exploration. He later joined the Jet Propulsion Laboratory (JPL), serving as distinguished visiting scientist (2000–2003), before becoming principal scientist, director of the Center for Life Detection, and senior research scientist from 2003 onward.

Coleman was elected president of the European Union of Geosciences from 2001 to 2003, and, through its merger with the European Geophysical Society, became one of the founding members of the European Geosciences Union. He is also a founding member of the Forensic Isotope Ratio Mass Spectrometry (FIRMS) network and continues to serve on its steering group. In addition, he is a scientific editor for the journal Terra Nova.

== Research ==
In his early research, Coleman, together with colleagues, characterized microbial metabolisms in geological material. They demonstrated that organic matter can form through processes such as sulfate reduction, concretion and dolmite formation, and recrystallization. He also devised a method for analyzing hydrogen isotopes in which pure zinc reacts with water to produce zinc oxide and hydrogen gas. This hydrogen was then used to measure the ratio of deuterium to hydrogen. His work further showed that sulfate-reducing bacteria could directly reduce ferric iron in anaerobic aquatic sediments. With Ader and other collaborators, Coleman introduced a method for analyzing the chlorine stable isotope composition of chlorate and perchlorate, first reporting δ^{37}CI values of synthetic CIO_{4}^{-}. He then measured microbial perchlorate reduction, documenting both positive and negative fractionations and revealing traces of strongly nonequilibrium oxidation. In July of 1985, Coleman published "Geochemistry of Diagenetic Non-Silicate Minerals Kinetic Considerations" along with several colleagues in which he explored the chemical changes that occur in minerals after they are buried.

In another study, Coleman discovered photosynthetic bacteria in 3.4 billion-year-old rocks. He also reported the first bromine isotope composition in natural water, establishing the initial natural variation range of bromine stable isotopes. In later work, his research focused on biological in-situ resource utilization to make it possible for astronauts to grow food on the lunar surface.

== Awards and honors ==
- 2014 – Prestwich Medal, Geological Society of London

== Selected articles ==
- Irwin, Hilary; Curtis, Charles; Coleman, Max (1977). "Isotopic evidence for source of diagenetic carbonates formed during burial of organic-rich sediments". Nature. 269 (5625): 209–213. Bibcode:1977Natur.269..209I. doi:10.1038/269209a0.
- Coleman, Max L.; Shepherd, Thomas J.; Durham, John J.; Rouse, John E.; Moore, Gillian R. (1982). "Reduction of water with zinc for hydrogen isotope analysis". Analytical Chemistry. 54 (6): 993–995. doi:10.1021/ac00243a035.
- Coleman, M. L.; Berner, R. A.; Durand, B.; Meadows, P. S.; Eglinton, Geoffrey (1985). "Geochemistry of diagenetic non-silicate minerals: kinetic considerations". Philosophical Transactions of the Royal Society of London. Series A, Mathematical and Physical Sciences. 315 (1531): 39–56. Bibcode:1985RSPTA.315...39C. doi:10.1098/rsta.1985.0028.
- Curtis, C. D.; Coleman, M. L.; Love, L. G. (1986). "Pore water evolution during sediment burial from isotopic and mineral chemistry of calcite, dolomite and siderite concretions". Geochimica et Cosmochimica Acta. 50 (10): 2321–2334. Bibcode:1986GeCoA..50.2321C. doi:10.1016/0016-7037(86)90085-2.
- Coleman, Max L.; Hedrick, David B.; Lovley, Derek R.; White, David C.; Pye, Kenneth (1993). "Reduction of Fe(III) in sediments by sulphate-reducing bacteria". Nature. 361 (6411): 436–438. Bibcode:1993Natur.361..436C. doi:10.1038/361436a0.
