= Catherine Nobes =

Professor of Cell Biology

Catherine D. Nobes
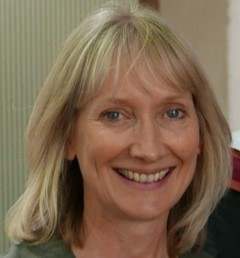
- Catherine Nobes
- Born: 1 April 1964 (age 62)
- Education: University College London; University of London
- Scientific career
- Workplaces: University College London; University of Bristol

Catherine D. Nobes (born 1 April 1964) is a Professor of Cell Biology and Head of School of Biochemistry at the University of Bristol. She studies the regulation of cell migration and invasion of cancer cells by Eph receptors.

== Early life and education ==
Nobes went to school at Windsor Girls' School and was a county level high jumper as a teenager. She studied biochemistry at the University of London. She completed a PhD at the University of Cambridge, working with Martin Brand. Nobes did brief Post-Docs in Helen Saibil and Aviva Tolkovsky's labs in Oxford before joining Alan Hall's laboratory at the University College London, where she identified the role of the GTPase CDC42 and effectors in forming actin-rich filopodial extensions. She investigated the regulation of actin polymerisation and how cell movement determines polarity and adhesion. She was awarded a Lister Institute of Preventive Medicine Fellowship in 2007, which allowed her to study cell migration in the context of axonal guidance and cancer metastasis.

== Research and career ==
Nobes was awarded a Medical Research Council Fellowship at University College London in 2001, where she worked in the Laboratory for Molecular Cell Biology (LMCB). Her work was featured in a Wellcome Trust exhibition of art and science, Growth and Form. She joined the University of Bristol as a Reader in 2006, and was promoted to a Professor of Cell Biology in 2012. She delivered her inaugural lecture in 2014, discussing cell migration and metastasis of cancer cells. Since 2014 she has been the head of the School of Biochemistry, the first woman to do so in the School's 50-year history.

Her work largely considers the social behaviour of tumor cells in the tumor microenvironment. She studies how colliding cells that come in to contact with each other stop migrating toward their partner, repolarise and move away from one another - a process known as contact inhibition of locomotion. She has studied how this cell behaviour is regulated by Eph-ephrin signalling. Eph receptors are part of the receptor tyrosine kinases; with two main families - EphA and EphB. Nobes showed that in metastatic prostate cancer cells, EphB receptors are misregulated in ways that might lead to cancer cell invasion / metastasis. She showed that similar activation of Eph signalling may underpin epithelial cell loosening during wound healing.

=== Academic service ===
Nobes has served on the grant allocation board of the Royal Society. She was the editor of the British Society for Cell Biology newsletter. In 2018 she joined the Advisory Committee of the Lister Institute of Preventive Medicine.
