= Ministry of Justice (Jordan) =

Government ministry of Jordan

Jordan Ministry of Justice
Department overview
- Formed: 1921
- Jurisdiction: Government of Jordan
- Headquarters: Amman
- Minister responsible: Bassam Talhouni, Minister of Justice

The Ministry of Justice (Arabic: وزارة العدل الاردنية) of the Hashemite Kingdom of Jordan is the ministry in the Government of Jordan responsible for Justice.

== List of ministers ==
- Mazhar Raslan (1921)
- Ibrahim Hashem (1922–1926)
- Reda Tawfiq (1926)
- Hussam ad-Din Jarallah (1926–1929)
- Ibrahim Hashem (1929–1931)
- Omar Hikmet (1931–1933)
- Ibrahim Hashem (1933–1938)
- Tawfik Abu Al-Huda (1938–1940)
- Omar Hikmet (1940–1941)
- Sheikh Ahmed Alawi Al-Saqqaf (1941–1943)
- Samir Al-Rifai (1943–1944)
- Mohammed Al Ansi (1944)
- Muslim Attar (1945–1946)
- Sheikh Fahmy Hashim (1946–1947)
- Bishara Ghassib (1947)
- Falah Almadadha (1947–1950)
- Rawhi Abdul Hadi (1950)
- Mohammed Al-Shuraiki (1950)
- Abdul Rahman Khalifa (1950)
- Sheikh Abdullah Ghosheh (1950–1951)
- Hazza' al-Majali (1951)
- Falah Almadadha (1951)
- Anastas Hanania (1951–1952)
- Aref Al-Anbtawi (1952)
- Rawhi Abdul Hadi (1952–1953)
- Ali Al-Hassan (1952–1953)
- Shafiq Arshidat (1953)
- Bahjat Talhouni (1953–1954)
- Saba Al-Aksha (1954)
- Hazza' al-Majali (1954–1955)
- Ali Al-Hassan (1955)
- Muhammad Ali Ja'abari (1955)
- Falah Almadadha (1955–1956)
- Ali Al-Hassan (1956)
- Awni Abd al-Hadi (1956)
- Shafiq Arshidat (1956–1957)
- Ibrahim Hashem (1957)
- Majed Abdel Hadi (1957)
- Ibrahim Hashem (1957)
- Falah Almadadha (1957)
- Ali Hindawi (1957)
- Walid Salah (1957)
- Ahmed Al Tarawneh (1957–1958)
- Muhammad Ali Ja'abari (1958)
- Ali Hindawi (1958)
- Muhammad Ali Ja'abari (1959)
- Anastas Hanania (1959)
- Anwar Al Nashashibi (1959–1960)
- Muhammad Ali Ja'abari (1960–1961)
- Hassan Daoud (1961)
- Yaqub Moamer (1961)
- Ahmed Al Tarawneh (1961–1962)
- Hassan Al Kayed (1963–1964)
- Bahjat Talhouni (1964–1965)
- Abdul Rahim Al Waked (1965)
- Jiris Haddadin (1965–1966)
- Simon David (1966–1970)
- Gamal Al-Nasser (1970)
- Fawaz Al Rousan (1970)
- Alzaim Mohammed Dawood (1970)
- Fawaz Al-Rousan (1970–1972)
- Salem Al-Musaeda (1972–1974)
- Naji Al Tarawneh (1974–1976)
- Hassan Al Kayed (1976)
- Ahmed Abdul Karim Tarawneh (1976–1979)
- Najib Arshidat (1979–1980)
- Ahmed Abdel-Karim Tarawneh (1980–1985)
- Riad Shaka (1985–1989)
- Rateb Al-Wazzani (1989)
- Yousef Al-Mubaidin(1989–1991)
- Majid Khalifa (1991)
- Tayseer Kanaan (1991)
- Yousef Al-Mubaidin (1991–1993)
- Rateb Al-Wazzani (1993)
- Taher Hekmat (1993–1994)
- Hisham El Tal (1994–1996)
- Abdel-Karim Deghmi (1996–1997)
- Riad Shaka (1997–1998)
- Jawdat Al-Subul (1998–1999)
- Hamza Haddad (1999–2000)
- Khalaf Masa'deh (2000)
- Faris Nabulsi (2000–2003)
- Salah al-Din al-Bashir (2003–2005)
- Mohammed Ali Alawneh (2005)
- Abdul Shakhanbeh (2005–2006)
- Sherif Zoubi (2006–2007)
- Ayman Odeh (2007–2010)
- Hisham El Tal (2010–2011)
- Hussein Majali (2011)
- Ibrahim Al-Amoush (2011)
- Selim Zoubi (2011–2012)
- Ibrahim Jazi (2012)
- Khalifah Suleiman (2012)
- Ghaleb Zu'bi (2012–2013)
- Ahmad Ziadat (2013)
- Bassam Talhouni (2013–2016)
- Awad Abdul Bakhit Abu Jarad Al-Mashkaba (2016–2021)
- Ahmad Ziadat (2021–2024)
- Bassam Talhouni (2024–present)

== See also ==
- Justice ministry
- Politics of Jordan
