= List of heads of state and government educated in the United States =

This is a list of non-American heads of state and heads of government who have received their undergraduate or postgraduate education from American colleges and universities.

Head of State or Government	Country	Term(s) of Office	University	Graduation
Hafizullah Amin	Democratic Republic of Afghanistan	September–December 1979	Columbia University	1962 (PhD in Education)
Ashraf Ghani	Islamic Republic of Afghanistan	2014–2021	Columbia University	1983 (PhD in Education)
Lester Bird	Antigua and Barbuda	1994–2004	University of Michigan	
Mauricio Macri	Argentina	2015–2019	Columbia University, University of Pennsylvania	
Hubert Minnis	Bahamas	2017–2021	University of Minnesota, Twin Cities	
Salman bin Hamad Al Khalifa	Bahrain	2020–present	American University	
Iajuddin Ahmed	Bangladesh	2002–2009	University of Wisconsin–Madison	
Fakhruddin Ahmed	Bangladesh	2007–2009	Williams College, Princeton University	
Muhammad Yunus	Bangladesh	2024–2026	Vanderbilt University	
Mark Eyskens	Belgium	1981	Columbia University	
Philippe of Belgium	Belgium	2013–present	Stanford University	1985 – MA, Political Science
Alexander De Croo	Belgium	2020–2025	Northwestern University	2002 – MBA
Manuel Esquivel	Belize	1984–1989, 1993–1998	Loyola University New Orleans	
Dean Barrow	Belize	2008–2020	University of Miami	
Johnny Briceño	Belize	2020–present	University of Texas	
Yeshey Zimba	Bhutan	2000–2001, 2004–2005	University of Wisconsin–Madison	
Jigme Thinley	Bhutan	1998–1999, 2003–2004, 2008–2013	Pennsylvania State University	
Tshering Tobgay	Bhutan	2013–2018, 2024–present	University of Pittsburgh, Harvard University	
Tshering Wangchuk	Bhutan	2018	George Washington University	
Lotay Tshering	Bhutan	2018–2023	Medical College of Wisconsin	
Wálter Guevara	Bolivia	1979	University of Chicago	
Hugo Banzer	Bolivia	1997–2001	School of the Americas	
Jorge Quiroga	Bolivia	2001–2002	Texas A&M University, St. Edward's University	
Eduardo Rodríguez Veltzé	Bolivia	2005–2006	Harvard University	
Gonzalo Sánchez de Lozada	Bolivia	1993–1997, 2002–2003	University of Chicago	1952
Mokgweetsi Masisi	Botswana	2018–2024	Florida State University	1991 – MA, Social Science Education
Duma Boko	Botswana	2024–presesnt	Harvard University	(Harvard Law School)
Kiril Petkov	Bulgaria	2021–2022	Harvard University	Master of Business Administration
Hun Manet	Cambodia	2023–present	New York University	2002 – MA, Economics
William Lyon Mackenzie King	Canada	1921–1926, 1926–1930, 1935–1948	University of Chicago, Harvard University	1898 (MA in political economy from Harvard), 1909 (PhD from Harvard)
Pierre Trudeau	Canada	1968–1979, 1980–1984	Harvard University	MA in Political Economy from the Harvard Kennedy School of Government
Ricardo Lagos	Chile	2000–2006	Duke University	1962 (PhD)
Sebastián Piñera	Chile	2010–2014, 2018–2022	Harvard University	
Lee Teng-Hui	Republic of China	1988–2000	Iowa State University Cornell University	1953 (Master's degree in agricultural economics); 1968 (PhD in agricultural economics)
Ma Ying-jeou	Republic of China	2008–2016	Harvard University	PhD
Tsai Ing-wen	Republic of China	2016–2024	Cornell University	Master of Laws at Cornell University Law School in 1980
Lai Ching-te	Republic of China	2024–present	Harvard University	MPH
Virgilio Barco Vargas	Colombia	1986–1990	Massachusetts Institute of Technology; Massachusetts Institute of Technology; Boston University	1943 - BSc, civil engineering 1952 - MA, economics 1954 - PhD, economics
Ernesto Samper	Colombia	1994–1998	Columbia University	
Juan Manuel Santos	Colombia	2010–2018	University of Kansas; Harvard University	Bachelor in Economics and Business Administration; Masters in Political Science from the Harvard Kennedy School of Government
Iván Duque	Colombia	2018–2022	American University, Georgetown University	
José Figueres Ferrer	Costa Rica	1948–1949, 1953–1958, 1970–1974	Massachusetts Institute of Technology	
Óscar Arias	Costa Rica	1986–1990, 2006–2010	Boston University	
José María Figueres	Costa Rica	1994–1998	Harvard University, United States Military Academy	
Miguel Ángel Rodríguez	Costa Rica	1998–2002	University of California, Berkeley	
Abel Pacheco	Costa Rica	2002–2006	Louisiana State University	
Laura Chinchilla	Costa Rica	2010–2014	Georgetown University	Masters in public policy
Luis Guillermo Solís	Costa Rica	2014–2018	University of Michigan	
Rodrigo Chaves Robles	Costa Rica	2022–2026	Ohio State University	BA, MA, Economics, 1994 – PhD, Agricultural Economics
Alassane Ouattara	Côte d'Ivoire	2010–present	Drexel University, University of Pennsylvania	
Kolinda Grabar-Kitarović	Croatia	2015–2020	George Washington University	Fulbright scholar on pre-doctoral research in international relations and security policy at George Washington University in 2003
Mario García Menocal	Cuba	1913–1921	Cornell University	1888 in the College of Engineering
Makarios III	Cyprus	1960–1974, 1974–1977	Boston University	
Nikos Christodoulides	Cyprus	2023–present	Queens College, CUNY, New York University	
Václav Klaus	Czech Republic	2003–2013	Cornell University	Attended Cornell in 1969
Oliver Seraphin	Dominica	1979–1980	Carnegie Mellon University	
Roosevelt Skerrit	Dominica	2004–present	New Mexico State University, University of Mississippi	
Hipólito Mejía	Dominican Republic	2000–2004	North Carolina State University	
Luis Abinader	Dominican Republic	2020–present	Hult International Business School	In Cambridge, Massachusetts
José Ramos-Horta	East Timor	2006–2012, 2022–present	Antioch University; Columbia University	1984 – MA, Peace Studies, Post-graduate courses in American Foreign Policy
Sixto Durán Ballén	Ecuador	1992–1996	Stevens Institute of Technology, University of Wisconsin–Madison, Columbia University	
Jamil Mahuad	Ecuador	1998–2000	Harvard University	1989 (MPA Masters of Public Administration)
Alfredo Palacio	Ecuador	2005–2007	Case Western Reserve University	
Rafael Correa	Ecuador	2007–2017	University of Illinois at Urbana–Champaign	1999 (Master of Science in Economics), 2001 (PhD in Economics)
Daniel Noboa	Ecuador	2023—present	New York University, Northwestern University, George Washington University	
Mohamed Morsi	Egypt	2012–2013	University of Southern California	
Abdel Fattah el-Sisi	Egypt	2014–present	United States Army War College	
Álvaro Magaña	El Salvador	1982–1984	University of Chicago	A.M 1955
José Napoleón Duarte	El Salvador	1984–1989	University of Notre Dame	B.S. in Engineering 1948
Alfredo Cristiani	El Salvador	1989–1994	Georgetown University	
Francisco Flores Pérez	El Salvador	1999–2004	University of Hartford, Amherst College, Harvard University	
Toomas Hendrik Ilves	Estonia	2006–2016	Columbia University University of Pennsylvania	Masters in psychology
Tesfaye Dinka	Ethiopia	1991	Syracuse University	
Hailemariam Desalegn	Ethiopia	2012–2018	Tampere University of Technology, Azusa Pacific University	
Mulatu Teshome	Ethiopia	2013–2018	The Fletcher School of Law and Diplomacy	
Alexander Stubb	Finland	2024–present	Furman University	
Lado Gurgenidze	Georgia	2007–2008	Middlebury College, Emory University	
Mikheil Saakashvili	Georgia	2008–2013	Columbia University, George Washington University	
Nika Gilauri	Georgia	2009–2012	Temple University	
Giorgi Kvirikashvili	Georgia	2015–2018	University of Illinois, Urbana-Champaign	
Salome Zourabichvili	Georgia	2018–present	Columbia University	Master's Degree
Karl Carstens	West Germany	1979–1984	Yale University	1949 (Master of Laws)
Kwame Nkrumah	Ghana	1957–1966	Lincoln University (Pennsylvania); University of Pennsylvania	1939 (BA from Lincoln), 1942 (MS in Education from Penn), 1943 (MA in Philosophy from Penn)
Andreas Papandreou	Greece	1981–1989, 1993–1996	Harvard University	1943 (PhD in economics)
Kostas Karamanlis	Greece	2004–2009	Tufts University	master's degree and doctorate in political sciences, international relations and diplomatic history
George Papandreou	Greece	2009–2011	Amherst College	
Lucas Papademos	Greece	2011–2012	Massachusetts Institute of Technology	
Antonis Samaras	Greece	2012–2015	Harvard University, Amherst College	
Kyriakos Mitsotakis	Greece	2019–2023, 2023–present	Harvard University, Stanford University	
Keith Mitchell	Grenada	1995–2008, 2013–2022	Howard University, American University	
Cheddi Jagan	Guyana	1992–1997	Howard University Dental School, and Northwestern University	
François Duvalier	Haiti	1957–1971	University of Michigan	studied public health
Claude Joseph	Haiti	2021	Long Island University, New School	
Ariel Henry	Haiti	2021–2024	Loma Linda University	
Leslie Voltaire	Haiti	2024–present	Cornell University	
Sanford B. Dole	Republic of Hawaii	1894–1900	Williams College	attended classes
Rafael Leonardo Callejas Romero	Honduras	1990–1994	Mississippi State University	B.S. and M.S. in agricultural economics
Carlos Roberto Flores	Honduras	1998–2002	Louisiana State University	
Ricardo Maduro	Honduras	2002–2006	Stanford University	
Porfirio Lobo Sosa	Honduras	2010–2014	University of Miami	
Juan Orlando Hernandez	Honduras	2014–2022	State University of New York, Albany	
Sir Donald Tsang	Hong Kong	2005–2012	Harvard University	1981 - MPA
Geir Hallgrímsson	Iceland	1974–1978	Harvard University	
Benedikt Gröndal	Iceland	1979–1980	Harvard University	
Geir Haarde	Iceland	1983–1987, 1988–1991	Illinois Institute of Technology, California Institute of Technology	
Geir Haarde	Iceland	2006–2009	Brandeis University, Johns Hopkins University, University of Minnesota, Twin Cities	
Bjarni Benediktsson	Iceland	2017, 2024	University of Miami	
Halla Tómasdóttir	Iceland	2024–present	Auburn University at Montgomery, Thunderbird School of Global Management	
Kristrún Frostadóttir	Iceland	2024–present	Yale University, Boston University	
Susilo Bambang Yudhoyono	Indonesia	2004–2014	United States Army Command and General Staff College, Webster University	
Jamshid Amuzegar	Iran	1977–1978	Cornell University	PhD
Ahmed Chalabi	Iraq	September 2003 (President, Governing Council)	Massachusetts Institute of Technology; University of Chicago	1965 - BSc, Mathematics; 1969 - PhD, Mathematics
Ghazi Mashal Ajil al-Yawer	Iraq	2004–2005	American University George Washington University	Masters from George Washington University
Mary Robinson	Ireland	1990–1997	Harvard University	LLM from Harvard Law School
Golda Meir	Israel	1969–1974	Milwaukee State Normal School	Graduate
Shimon Peres	Israel	1977, 1984–1986, 1995–1996, 2007–2014	The New School, New York University, Harvard University	
Benjamin Netanyahu	Israel	1996–1999, 2009–2021, 2022–present	Massachusetts Institute of Technology; Harvard University	B.Sc in Architecture from MIT; MBA from MIT
Ehud Barak	Israel	1999–2001	Stanford University	1978 (Masters in engineering-economic systems)
Isaac Herzog	Israel	2021–present	Cornell University, New York University	
Mario Monti	Italy	2011–2013	Yale University	M.Sc. in economics, 1968
Mario Draghi	Italy	2021–2022	Massachusetts Institute of Technology	1977 - PhD, economics
Hugh Shearer	Jamaica	1967–1972	Howard University	
Edward Seaga	Jamaica	1980–1989	Harvard University	
Portia Simpson-Miller	Jamaica	2006–2007, 2012–2016	Union Institute and University	
Andrew Holness	Jamaica	2011–2012, 2016–present	Northeastern University	
Takeo Miki	Japan	1974–1976	University of Southern California	
Shinzō Abe	Japan	2006–2007, 2012–2020	University of Southern California	Public policy
Tarō Asō	Japan	2008–2009	Stanford University	
Yukio Hatoyama	Japan	2009–2010	Stanford University	
Zaid Rifai	Jordan	1973–1974, 1984–1989	Harvard University	
Kassim Rimawi	Jordan	1980	Columbia University	
Zeid bin Shaker	Jordan	1989, 1991–1993, 1995–1996	US Army Command and General Staff College	
Taher Masri	Jordan	1991	University of North Texas	
Abdul Karim Kabariti	Jordan	1996–1997	St. Edward's University	
Fayez Tarawneh	Jordan	1998–1999, 2012	University of Southern California	
Ali Abu Al-Ragheb	Jordan	2000–2003	University of Tennessee	
Faisal Al-Fayez	Jordan	2003–2005	Boston University	
Adnan Badran	Jordan	2005	Oklahoma State University, Michigan State University	
Marouf al-Bakhit	Jordan	2005–2007, 2011	University of Southern California	
Nader Al-Dahabi	Jordan	2007–2009	Auburn University	
Samir Rifai	Jordan	2009–2011	Harvard University	
Abdullah Ensour	Jordan	2012–2016	University of Michigan	
Hani Mulki	Jordan	2016–2018	Rensselaer Polytechnic Institute	
Omar Razzaz	Jordan	2018–2020	Harvard University	
Jafar Hassan	Jordan	2024–present	Harvard University, Boston University	
Uhuru Kenyatta	Kenya	2013–2022	Amherst College	1985 (Political science)
Mohammad Sabah Al-Salem Al-Sabah	Kuwait	2024	Claremont McKenna College, Harvard University	
Ahmad Al-Abdullah Al-Sabah	Kuwait	2024–present	University of Illinois	
Aigars Kalvītis	Latvia	2004–2007	University of Wisconsin	
Valdis Dombrovskis	Latvia	2009–2014	University of Maryland, College Park	
Krišjānis Kariņš	Latvia	2019–2023	St. John's College (Maryland), University of Pennsylvania	
Edgars Rinkēvičs	Latvia	2023–present	Dwight D. Eisenhower School for National Security and Resource Strategy	
Salim Al-Huss	Lebanon	1976–1980, 1987–1990, 1998–2000	Indiana University Bloomington	
Émile Lahoud	Lebanon	1998–2007	Naval War College	
Saad Hariri	Lebanon	2009–2011, 2016–2020	Georgetown University	
Pakalitha Mosisili	Lesotho	1998–2012, 2015–2017	University of Wisconsin, Madison	
Moeketsi Majoro	Lesotho	2020–2022	Washington State University	
Joseph Jenkins Roberts	Liberia	1848–1856, 1872–1876	Norfolk Academy, Maury High School	
Edward James Roye	Liberia	1870–1871	Ohio University	
Amos Sawyer	Liberia	1990–1994	Northwestern University	
Wilton G. S. Sankawulo	Liberia	1995–1996	Pacific Lutheran Theological Seminary, University of Iowa	
Charles Taylor	Liberia	1997–2003	Bentley University	
Ellen Johnson Sirleaf	Liberia	2006–2018	Madison Business College University of Colorado Harvard University	1964 (BBA in Accounting) 1970 (Economics diploma); 1971 (Master of Public Administration, Harvard Kennedy School of Government)
George Weah	Liberia	2018–2024	DeVry University	
Joseph Boakai	Liberia	2024–present	Kansas State University	
Hastings Banda	Malawi	1961–1994	Central State University Indiana University University of Chicago Meharry Medical College	1925 – diploma, 1931 – BA, University of Chicago, 1937 – MD
Christopher Loeak	Marshall Islands	2011–2016	Portland Community College Hawaii Pacific College Gonzaga University School of Law	1978 (Bachelor's from Hawaii Pacific), 1982 (JD from Gonzaga)
Carlos Salinas	Mexico	1988–1994	Harvard University	1973 (MPA from the Harvard Kennedy School of Government), 1976 (master's in Political Economics), 1976 (PhD in Political Economics and Government)
Ernesto Zedillo	Mexico	1994–2000	Yale University	PhD
Vicente Fox	Mexico	2000–2006	Harvard University	attended classes
Felipe Calderón	Mexico	2006–2012	Harvard University	Masters in Public Administration from the Harvard Kennedy School of Government
Maia Sandu	Moldova	2019, 2020–present	Harvard University	2010 – diploma, Kennedy School of Government at Harvard University – MD
Natalia Gavrilița	Moldova	2021–2023	Harvard University	Harvard Kennedy School – MPP
Alexandru Munteanu	Moldova	2025–2026	Columbia University	MPA in Economic Policy Management
Vasile Tofan	Moldova	2026–present	Harvard University	MBA
Albert II	Monaco	2005–present	Amherst College	1977–1981 BA, Political Science
Birendra	Nepal	1972–2001	Harvard University	1967–68 (studied political theory)
Enrique Bolaños	Nicaragua	2002–2007	Saint Louis University	1962 (B.A. in industrial engineering)
Nnamdi Azikiwe	Nigeria	1963–1966	Howard University Lincoln University (Pennsylvania) University of Pennsylvania	
Gro Harlem Brundtland	Norway	1990–1996	Harvard University	1965 - MPH
Zulfikar Ali Bhutto	Pakistan	1971–1973	University of Southern California, University of California, Berkeley	1950 (B.A. in political science from Berkeley)
Benazir Bhutto	Pakistan	1988–1990, 1993–1996	Harvard University	1973 (political science)
Arnulfo Arias	Panama	1940–1941, 1949–1951, 1968	University of ChicagoHarvard University	MD from Harvard
Ricardo Arias Espinosa	Panama	1955–1956	Georgetown University	1935 (Walsh School of Foreign Service)
José Ramón Guizado	Panama	1955	Vanderbilt University	B.E., 1920
Ricardo de la Espriella	Panama	1982–1984	Stanford University	Economics
Jorge Illueca	Panama	February–October 1984	Harvard University University of Chicago	1955 (Law)
Ernesto de la Guardia Navarro	Panama	1956–1960	Dartmouth College	Masters in Finance
Ernesto Pérez Balladares	Panama	1994–1999	University of Notre Dame University of Pennsylvania	1969 (Masters in Economics from Notre Dame), 1970 (Masters in Marketing from Pennsylvania)
Mireya Moscoso	Panama	1999–2004	Miami-Dade College	Interior design diploma
Martín Torrijos	Panama	2004–2009	Texas A&M University	1987 (Political Science and Economics)
Laurentino Cortizo	Panama	2019–2024	Norwich University St. Edwards University University of Texas at Austin	Bachelors in Business Admin. (Norwich), Masters in Business Admin (St. Edwards), Doctoral Work in Business (UT Austin)
Alberto Fujimori	Peru	1990–2000	University of Wisconsin–Milwaukee	1971 (MS in Mathematics)
José P. Laurel	Philippines	1943–1945	Yale University	1920 (Law)
Corazon Aquino	Philippines	1986–1992	College of Mount Saint Vincent	1953 (degree in French)
Salvador Laurel	Philippines	February–March 1986	Yale University	1953 (LL.M.), 1960 (Law)
Fidel V. Ramos	Philippines	1992–1998	United States Military Academy University of Illinois	1950 (West Point), 1951 (Master's degree in Civil Engineering from Illinois)
Gloria Macapagal Arroyo	Philippines	2001–2010	Georgetown University	attended 1964–1966
Marek Belka	Poland	2004–2005	Columbia University, University of Chicago	attended classes
José Manuel Barroso	Portugal	2002–2004	Georgetown University	1998 (research for a PhD)
Goh Chok Tong	Singapore	1990–2004	Williams College	1967 (MA in Development Economics)
Lee Hsien Loong	Singapore	2004–2024	Harvard University	1980 MPA from the Harvard Kennedy School of Government
Lawrence Wong	Singapore	2024–present	University of Wisconsin–Madison; University of Michigan; Harvard University	1994 - BS, Economics (University of Wisconsin–Madison); 1995 - MA, Applied Economics (University of Michigan); 2004 - MPA (Harvard University)
Julius Maada Bio	Sierra Leone	2018–present	American University	1999 - BA, International Service 2001 - MS, International Service
Abdiweli Gaas	Somalia	2011–2012	Vanderbilt University; Harvard University; George Mason University	MPA from the Harvard Kennedy School of Government
Syngman Rhee	South Korea	1948–1960	George Washington University, Harvard University, Princeton University	1907 (GWU), 1909 (MA from Harvard), 1910 (PhD in politics from Princeton)
Felipe VI	Spain	2014–present	Georgetown University	1991, MSc from Walsh School of Foreign Service
Olof Palme	Sweden	1969–1976, 1982–1986	Kenyon College	1948 (BA)
Meechai Ruchuphan	Thailand	1992	Southern Methodist University	1966 (Master of Laws)
Thaksin Shinawatra	Thailand	2001–2006	Eastern Kentucky University; Sam Houston State University	1975 (Master of Criminal Justice); 1978 (Doctor of Criminal Justice)
Yingluck Shinawatra	Thailand	2011–2014	Kentucky State University	1990 (Master of Public Administration)
Srettha Thavisin	Thailand	2023–2024	University of Massachusetts; Claremont Graduate University	Bachelor of Economics; Master of Finance
Suriya Juangroongruangkit	Thailand	2025	University of California, Berkeley	1978 (Bachelor of Engineering)
Anutin Charnvirakul	Thailand	2025–present	Hofstra University	1989 (Bachelor of Engineering)
Zine El Abidine Ben Ali	Tunisia	1987–2011	Senior Intelligence School (Maryland) School for Anti-Aircraft Field Artillery (Texas)	training
Bulent Ecevit	Turkey	1974, 1977, 1978–1979, 1999–2002	Harvard University	attended classes
Tansu Ciller	Turkey	1993–1996	University of New Hampshire, University of Connecticut, Yale University	
Pope Leo XIV	Vatican City	2025-Present	Villanova University	
