= Sharaf (name) =

Sharaf is masculine given name of Arabic origin. Notable people with the name include:

== Given name ==
- Sharaf Abdulla (born 1991), Maldivian film actor
- Sharaf al-Dawla (960–988/89), Buyid amir of Kerman and Fars
- Sharaf Mahfood (born 1966), Yemeni footballer
- Sharaf al-Zaman al-Marwazi (1056/57–1124/25), Iranian doctor and zoologist
- Sharaf al-Muluk (died 1334), ruler of the Bavand dynasty
- Sharaf bin Rajeh (1881–1955), Jordanian Emir, regent, and politician

== Surname ==
- Abdelhamid Sharaf (1939–1980), Jordanian politician
- Ben Sharaf (born 2006), Israeli basketball player
- Essam Sharaf (born 1952), Egyptian academic and politician
- Hisham Sharaf (born 1956), Yemeni civil engineer and politician
- Jayda Sharaf (born 2001), Egyptian artistic swimmer
- Leila A. Sharaf (born 1940), Lebanese Jordanian politician
- Mohammed Sharaf (born 1961), Emirati businessman
- Nouran Sharaf (born 1985), Egyptian volleyball player
- Omar Sharaf (1925–1993), Egyptian diplomat
- Omran Sharaf (born 1984), Emirati engineer
- Sami Sharaf (1929–2023), Egyptian military officer and politician
- Samson Simon Sharaf, Pakistani military officer
- Sherif Fawaz Sharaf (born 1938), Jordanian diplomat
- Wael Sharaf, stage name of Wael Subhi Al Rifai (born 1977), Syrian actor and film director

== See also ==
- Shah Sharaf (1640–1724), Punjabi Sufi poet
- Sharaf, disambiguation page
