= 2011–2012 Jordanian protests =

Series of protests in Jordan, part of Arab Spring

Jordanian protests (2011–12)
- Part of the Arab Spring
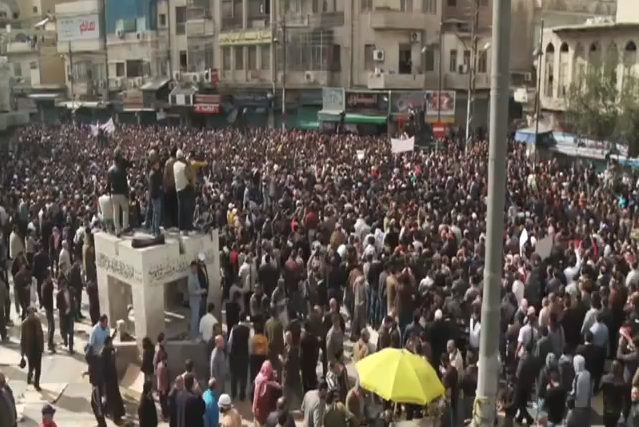
- A mass protest in Amman, Jordan, November 2012, over price hikes
- Date: 14 January 2011 – 4 October 2012 (1 year, 8 months, 2 weeks and 6 days)
- Location: Jordan
- Caused by: Corruption; Internet censorship; Inflation; Low salaries; Unemployment; Regressive taxes; Inspiration from concurrent regional protests
- Goals: Constitutional monarchy; Electoral reform; Establishment of a Republic; End to corruption; Political freedom
- Methods: Demonstrations; Strike action; Riots; Sit-ins; Self-immolation; Online activism; Civil disobedience; Civil resistance
- Status: In February 2011, King Abdullah II dismisses Prime Minister Rifai and his cabinet; In October 2011, Abdullah dismisses Prime Minister Bakhit and his cabinet after complaints of slow progress on promised reforms; In April 2012, as the protests continues, Al-Khasawneh resigned, and the King appoints Fayez al-Tarawneh as the new Prime Minister of Jordan; In October 2012, King Abdullah dissolves the parliament for new early elections, and appoints Abdullah Ensour as the new Prime Minister of Jordan

Parties
(Jordan) Jordanian opposition parties • Muslim Brotherhood • Leftist parties • Trade unions	Government of Jordan; Ministry of Interior; Public Security Directorate; General Directorate of Gendarmerie; General Intelligence Department

Lead figures
• Retired General Ali Habashnah	• King Abdullah II • Prime Minister Samir Rifai

Number
• Protesters: 6,000–10,000	

Casualties and losses
1 dead 70 injured	2 dead and 13 police injured

Casualties
- Arrested: 157 +

The Jordanian protests were a series of protests in Jordan that began in January 2011, and resulted in the firing of the cabinet ministers of the government. In its early phase, protests in Jordan were initially against unemployment, inflation, corruption. along with demanding for real constitutional monarchy and electoral reforms.

Food inflation and salaries were a cause for resentment in the country. The 2010-2011 Tunisian Revolution and the 2011 Egyptian Revolution also raised hopes for political change in the region. Together with unrest elsewhere in the Middle East and North Africa, including the disturbances in Syria and Yemen, they were part of the Arab Spring.

King Abdullah II responded to the protests by reforming around a third of the constitution, establishing the Independent Election Commission, and vowing to embark on a democratic trajectory. He sacked three prime ministers in 18 months, settling on Abdullah Ensour as prime minister in 2012 and called for early elections in 2013. Later, introducing complete proportional representation to the House of Representatives in the 2016 parliamentary election, introducing decentralization in the 2017 local elections, and reforming the judiciary.

== Background ==
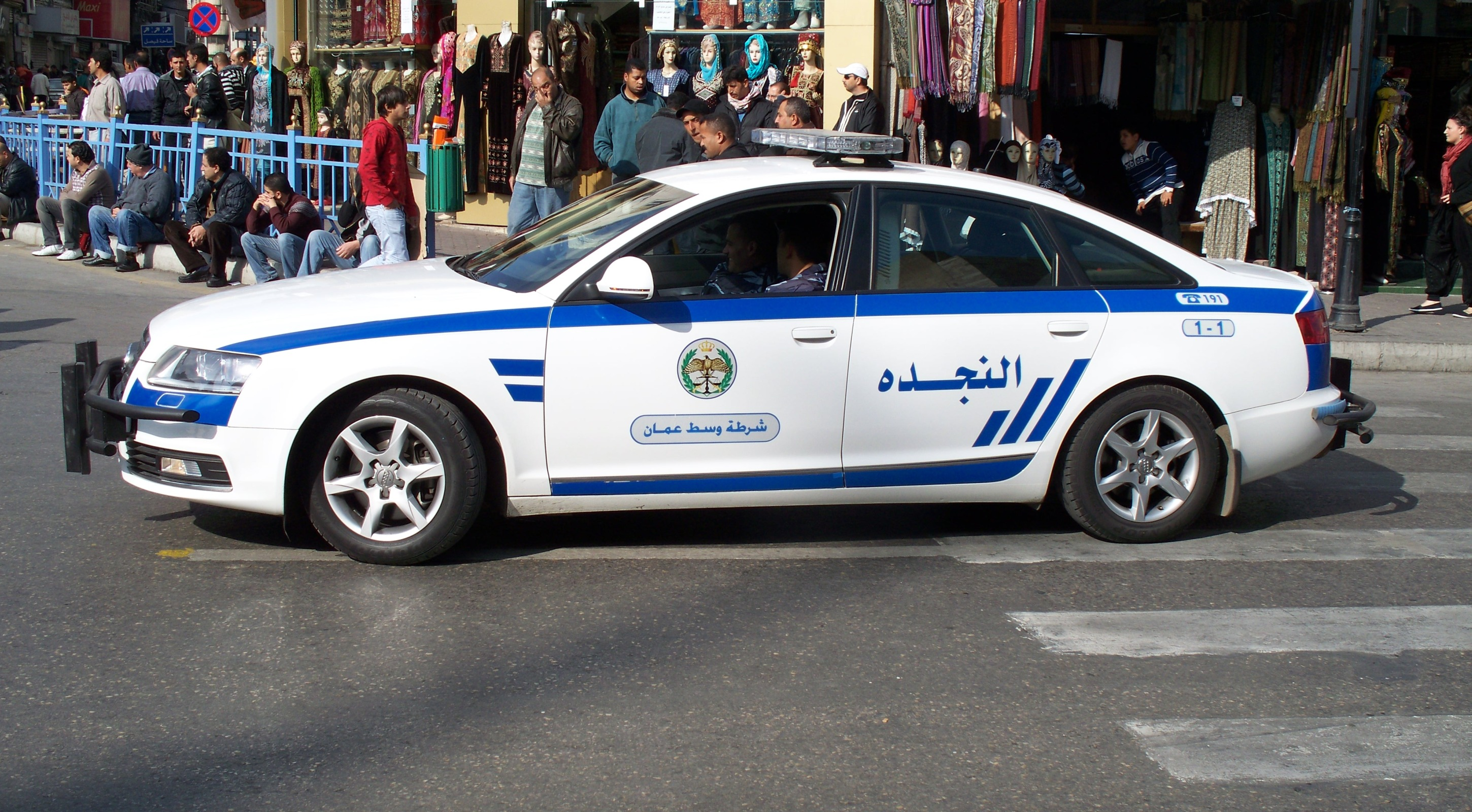
Jordanian Police Audi A6 in Karak, Jordan.

Jordan's economy continues to struggle, weighed down by a record deficit of $2 billion in between 2010 and 2011 due to the Arab Spring. Inflation in Jordan has risen by 1.5% to 6.1% in December 2010, and unemployment and poverty have become rampant, estimated at 12% and 25% respectively. The government is also accused of impoverishing the working class with regressive tax codes which forced the poor to pay a higher proportion of their income as tax. The parliament is accused of serving as a "rubber stamp" to the executive branch.

Jordan has a history of persecuting activists and journalists. The country amended its penal code in August 2010 and passed a Law of Information System Crimes, to regulate the Internet. Revised laws continue to criminalize peaceful expression and extend those provisions to Internet expression. Jordanian authorities prosecuted peaceful dissidents and prohibited peaceful gatherings to protest government policies. Dissidents confined by the General Intelligence Department routinely sign confessions. According to a report by Amnesty International, intelligence agents in Jordan frequently use torture to extract confessions from suspects.

Some analysts suggests that since peninsular Arabic speaking Jordanians form the "bedrock" of the government's support, while self-identifying Palestinians are generally closer to the opposition. Such analysis suggest that many government supporters are worried that if Palestinians are allowed a greater role in the country's politics, they could drag it into the Israeli–Palestinian conflict against Jordan's best interests. Conversely, Palestinian-Jordanian protesters want their degree of political power to reflect their significant demographic share. However, evidence of historical and recent protests suggests that the backbone of the protests are of peninsular Arabic speaking Jordanians disfranchised by liberal economic policies instituted in the country during the last decades. Specifically, previous mass protests include protests in 1989 in the city of Karak and other southern towns in the country known as April 1989 uprising (هبة نيسان) that led to reintroduction of democratic life. In 1996, bread riots erupted in Ma'an and other southern cities in Jordan as well. Both are predominantly of peninsular Arabic speaking Jordanian origins. More recently, the 2011–2012 uprising started with movements all over the country specially in towns with a predominantly east-Jordanian population known locally as Al-Hirak. Therefore, according to many analysts while protests in Amman might generates a media buzz about a revolution in Jordan, but discontent in rural Jordan among peninsular Arabic speaking Jordanians is what would really tip the scales. Regardless of identity and demographic sensitivities both groups tend to agree on the need for a more robust economy and a cure for Jordan's crippling unemployment. However, many argue that the sensitive demographic balance in the country will ultimately decide how wide and deep political reforms will go.

== Protests ==
=== Early stage ===
Protests began on 14 January 2011, as protesters demanded Samir Rifai's resignation as well as economic conditions. On 26 January, the Muslim Brotherhood, one of the largest opposition groups in Jordan, urged Jordanians to pour into streets on 28 January to continue the protests against prime minister Samir Rifai's economic policies and the political situation in the country.

Demonstrators protested rising prices and demanded the dismissal of the Prime Minister and his government, but they have not directly challenged the king, criticism of whom is banned in Jordan. The demonstrators have been peaceful and have not been confronted by the police. So far no deaths, injuries or riots have been reported; however the protests' leaders said that the king had failed to take substantial steps to address mounting public resentment and they warned that unless real changes are made, that unrest could worsen. King Abdullah II, a key U.S. ally, has come under pressure recently from various protesters which include a coalition of Islamists, secular opposition groups and a group of retired army generals, all of whom are calling for substantial political and economic reforms.

Ali Habashnah, one of the retired generals desiring reforms, said that unrest has spread to rural areas dominated by Bedouin tribes. These tribes have been a traditional backbone of the monarchy. It was the first time, he said, that the Bedouins had joined with other groups in demands for change.

On 28 January, following Friday prayers, 3,500 activists from the Muslim Brotherhood, trade unions, and communist and leftist organisations demanded that Samir Rifai step down as prime minister and that the government control rising prices, inflation and unemployment. Protests were reported in Amman and six other cities. Thousands took to the streets in the capital, Amman, as well as several other cities shouting, "We want change." Banners complained of high food and fuel prices and demanded the resignation of the prime minister, an appointee of the king.

On 2 February, demonstrations continued in demanding that King Abdullah II sack his newly appointed prime minister. Hamza Mansour, one of the leaders of the Jordanian Muslim Brotherhood, demanded elections to choose another prime minister. He said that Al-Bakhit "doesn't believe in democracy."

The day after King Abdullah met with Muslim Brotherhood leaders at the royal palace, in an attempt to defuse tensions in the country, on 4 February, hundreds of people, including members of leftist groups and the Muslim Brotherhood, congregated outside the prime minister's office to demand economic and political reforms and the dissolution of parliament. They then marched to the Egyptian embassy in support of the anti-government protesters in that country. On 18 February, protesters who gathered in central Amman to demand political reform, clashed with a small group of government supporters that eyewitnesses claim attacked the protesters with sticks and stones, before the police restored order. Eyewitnesses said about 2,000 protesters, mostly young people joined by trade unionists and others, took to the streets after prayers at the Husseini Mosque, though other reports said the number was about 300.

About 7,000–10,000 protesters were on the streets of Amman on 25 February, in the largest protests so far.

In the first week of March anti-government protesters continued where opposition groups demanded such greater political freedoms as a constitutional monarchy.

On 24 March, Al Jazeera reported that around 500 protesters, mainly university students and politically unaffiliated unemployed graduates set up a protest camp in a main square in the capital to press demands for the ouster of the prime minister, seen as insufficiently reformist, as well as wider public freedoms. Other demands include dissolving the parliament, which was seen as too docile, dismantling the intelligence department and giving greater powers to the people, including a new, more proportional, election law. Jordan's opposition also wanted to strip the king of some of his powers, specifically in appointing the prime minister, as they wanted the premier to be elected by a popular vote.

On 25 March, clashes occurred between supporters of the king and more than 2000 protesters camped in Gamal Abdel Nasser Circle. Some witnesses said the police stood by as government supporters moved into the square and began throwing stones. As many as 100 people were reported injured, most with head wounds, while two people are said to have been killed. However, the next day in a press conference, the commandant of public security, Lieutenant General Hussein Al-Majali confirmed that there was one death only, with 62 injured civilians, and 58 injured policemen (including a brigadier general and a lieutenant colonel). Forensic medicine report confirmed that there were no signs of any injury, and that the patient actually died of circulatory collapse secondary to chronic ischemic heart disease. In the same press conference, Al-Majali also confirmed that 8 civilians and 17 policemen were still receiving hospital treatment at the time of the conference, and also stressed that policemen were completely unarmed and they interfered just to save the lives of people whatever their political view is. On the same day of clashes, thousands gathered in Al-Hussein Gardens, west of Amman, to express loyalty and allegiance to the king, dancing to national songs and waving large Jordanian flags and pictures of the monarch.

On 1 April, nearly 400 policemen were deployed to separated hundreds of government supporters and pro-reform activists holding rival rallies outside municipal offices in Amman.

On 15 April, more than 2,000 Jordanians took to the streets throughout the country demanding greater political representation, with half of them demonstrating in Amman, immediately after prayers. Also, a crowd of a few hundred Islamists clashed with a somewhat smaller group of monarchy loyalists in Zarqa. Eight civilians and 83 policemen were wounded, including 4 in critical condition.

=== Protests continues ===
On 13 June, the motorcade of King Abdullah II was attacked with stones and bottles by protesters in the city of Tafileh, although this was later denied, a royal official stating that they were enthusiastically greeted. Some indication is that this was actually an outbreak of violence between the Darak (Jordanian Gendarmerie) and local unemployed protesters. It is alleged that the local mayor caused the Darak to force back the protesters not wanting his city to look bad, the protesters replied with stones and empty bottles. The King is alleged to have been 12 km away.

On 17 June, youth groups and activists will protest calling on greater reforms, which the kingdom has dismissed for 2–3 years, including the election of a prime minister and cabinet.

A rare outbreak of violence marred protests in Amman on 15 July, with police beating journalists and protesters alike. The Public Security Directorate offered a mixed response, accepting full responsibility for the violence and promising compensation to journalists who suffered injuries or damage to equipment, but blaming demonstrators for instigating hostilities.

On 16 July, a more peaceful demonstration took place.

An Al Jazeera correspondent covering a protest on 20 July had a mixed reaction to the way security forces handled the situation, noting that while police and gendarmes respected all attendees' freedom of speech and acted quickly and effectively to prevent clashes between pro-reform demonstrators and government supporters, police also did nothing to prevent verbal harassment and intimidation of the former group by vocal loyalists.

In Amman, on 29 July, around 3,000 Muslim Brotherhood activists at the demonstration raised their right hand and took an oath to continue peaceful protests until their demands for political reform in the kingdom are met.

On 14 August, clashes erupted between government loyalists and pro-reform demonstrators in a street protest in Karak after midnight.

After a lull in September, protests started again on 7 October, when former prime minister Ahmad Obeidat led over 2000 people in a march outside the Grand Husseini Mosque in central Amman. There were also marches in the cities of Karka, Tafileh, Maan, Jerash and Salt.

There was a further march on 15 October, as part of the global "Occupy" movement, which was held in the northern city of Salhub, which is located 50 kilometers (32 miles) from the Jordanian capital Amman. A counter-protest attacked the marchers, hurling stones and firing their guns into the air. The next day, a memorandum signed by 70 out of 120 lawmakers was presented to the royal palace demanding that the prime minister and the cabinet be sacked. Much to the surprise of the opposition in the country, the king almost immediately complied, naming Awn Shawkat Al-Khasawneh to head the new government the next day.

Riots took place in the several cities and towns in mid November, most notably in Ramtha, which lasted three days and was sparked by the death in custody of Najem Azaizeh in Salt, which continued on and off for weeks and the towns of Qatraneh and Jafr.

Also, the trial of nearly 100 protesters indicted the previous April began, and much from the capital Amman were arrested for corruption.

In December, there were protests in Amman, and riots in the northeastern cities of Mafraq and Qatraneh.

On 24 December, protesters gathered outside of the prime minister's office to protest the treatment of protesters by the security forces the previous day in Mafraq.

=== Protests subside ===
For most of 2012, protests subsided. The uprising in neighboring Syria, which had led to tens of thousands of deaths, dampened the enthusiasm of some Jordanian activists, who reportedly feared chaos developing in Jordan. In November 2011, King Abdullah called for a change in government in Syria, one of the first of Syria's neighboring leaders to do so.

=== Renewed protests ===
On late 1 September 2012, Jordanians from Amman to the southern city of Ma'an rallied for the immediate resignation of Prime Minister Fayez al-Tarawneh for issuing a 10 percent fuel price increase. Protestors blamed the Royal Palace for tolerating rampant corruption they say is the real reason for Jordan's economic crisis. During the rallies, Islamists, leftists and independent activists called on Amman to roll back the decision, chanting: "Jordanian people, why are they draining us?" Also at the Interior Ministry, protesters and the Muslim Brotherhood charged the price hike had been directed by the World Bank. Protests continued on the next day when taxi drivers blocked a main road in Amman as they abandoned their cars and marched to the ministry of transport in opposition to the hike, while citizens in the northern city of Irbid held a sit-in to protest the move. Amid rising protests over the measure, King Abdullah on Sunday suspended a government decision to increase prices of the fuel.

On early 8 September, Jordanian anti-riot forces stormed a protest in the southern city of Tafileh after participants began chanting slogans reportedly criticizing King Abdullah II. According to eyewitnesses and activists, authorities fired tear gas and live rounds to disperse a group of some 60 protesters after activists began chanting slogans insulting the monarch, arresting 15 participants. A Jordanian security source confirmed that police arrested 15 protesters who currently face charges of attempting to "undermine the regime" and "incite a riot." Jordanian security officials refused to disclose the anti-King slogans allegedly chanted by protesters. Activists contend that their rally was peaceful prior to the riot forces' storming. Tafileh residents had organised the rally to protest the detention of local activist Mohammed Al Amaara, who was arrested hours earlier for reportedly making statement criticising Queen Rania during an anti-government protest following Friday noon prayers. The clashes came as activists took to the streets in nine of Jordan's 12 provinces on Friday in a series of anti-government rallies urging Prime Minister Fayez Tarawneh to step down for a recent rise in fuel and water prices.

On 5 October, thousands of Jordanians attended a protest demanding political reforms in Amman, hours after King Abdullah II dissolved parliament and called early parliamentary elections. Video footage showed protesters chanting slogans and waving flags. The AFP news agency quoted people as shouting: "We demand constitutional reform before the people revolt. The people want to reform the regime."

=== 2012 fuel price protests ===
On 13 November, protests erupted across the country nationwide in response to an increase in fuel prices and other basic goods announced by Prime Minister Abdullah Ensour. Demonstrators burned tires, smashed traffic lights and blocked roads in several Jordanian cities. Riot police officers tried to quell some of the crowds with tear gas. There were calls for a general strike on Wednesday. Protesters blamed Jordan's problems on King Abdullah II. They also demanded the resignation of the prime minister. About 2,000 protesters chanted ""Revolution, revolution, it is a popular revolution," and "Freedom is from God, in spite of you, Abdullah," in an impromptu demonstration at a main Amman square, housing the Interior Ministry and other vital government departments. Elsewhere in Salt, 100 protesters pelted stones at policemen as they tried to break their lines to get to Ensour's home to demand his resignation. Riot police responded by firing tear gas. In some cities in Jordan's south, inhabited by tribal Bedouins who are traditional supporters of the king, hundreds of protesters took to the streets to chant slogans calling for the ouster of the prime minister, but also criticizing the king. In Mazar, dozens of protesters burned down the main court building after stealing documents. Further south in Ma'an, 500 protesters blocked the streets, burning tires and throwing stones at riot police, who were firing tear gas. There were no immediate reports of injuries. In Sareeh, angry protesters burned down a gas station. Nationwide protests in Jordan continued for the second day. Teachers went on strike, and other unions announced a two-hour work stoppage for Sunday. The crowds included first-time protesters and tribal members who have been the king's political base. Violence was most severe in Irbid, where the authorities said a police station was attacked by armed demonstrators, leading to the fatal shooting of Qais al-Omari, 27, and injuries to a dozen police officers and four protesters. A police corporal was also injured when someone fired an automatic pistol from a moving car.

In response to the protests, foreign minister Nasser Judeh said the government had tried to respond to the opposition over the past year with the establishment of an independent elections commission before balloting set for January 2013 and the formation of a constitutional court, among other changes.

The Jordanian government said Qais al-Omari was killed in a shootout with a group of armed men who assaulted a police station here on Wednesday night. But two members of his family and a witness to the killing said that he was unarmed, part of a group of about 30 unarmed men who walked to the police station to complain about abusive language they said officers had used while breaking up an earlier protest. Angry crowds then set fire to several government cars and burned down a municipal building, where a heavy contingent of plainclothes police officers was watching children play on Thursday.

On 16 November, thousands of demonstrators chanted the Arab Spring slogan "The people want to overthrow the regime" in the nationwide Jordan after Friday prayers, with escalating calls for Jordan's King Abdullah II to abdicate. Friday's protest near the main Al-Hussein Mosque in downtown Amman was peaceful, with unarmed police separating the demonstrators denouncing the ruler from a smaller crowd chanting in support of the monarch. The main crowd of about 3,000 protesters chanted "Go down Abdullah, go down," as police, some in riot gear, largely stayed away from crowd. However, Abdullah loyalists clashed with anti-government protesters near the city's Wasfi al-Tal square on Friday night, with dozens of protesters reportedly being beaten by the king's supporters. The AFP news agency estimated at 10,000 people, including Islamists, leftists and youth activists, chanted "Freedom, freedom, down with Abdullah." Demonstrations were also held just outside Amman in the Baqa'a Palestinian refugee camp and in the cities of Tafilah, Karak, Ma'an, Irbid and Jerash to its north. Amid unprecedented protests by Jordanians calling for him to quit, King Abdullah II has cancelled a visit to United Kingdom he was due to make next week.

Jordanian unions held a strike on Sunday 18 November to protest fuel price rises. The head of Jordan's 15-member professional associations body said all 15 unions except the nurses' union stopped working between 11:00 am and 2:00 pm on Sunday. Teachers' union also held a strike on Sunday, with spokesman Ayman al-Akur saying "the strike was observed by 70 to 75 percent of schools across the country", demanding the king intervene to reverse the decision to raise fuel prices.

King Abdullah II visited the public security and gendarmerie personnel who were injured in fuel price riots and are receiving treatment at King Hussein Medical Center and wished them a speedy recovery. He praised security forces' discipline and self-restraint in dealing with the latest riots and the protest movement that began about two years ago.

== Concerns ==
As the original protests were based to a degree on rising food prices, the expectation of food riots in summer 2012 grew due to the rise of global food prices and a drought in the country. This caused concern amongst the political class.

== Casualties ==
Deaths
Name	Age	From	Date of death	Cause of death
Qais Al Omari	23	Irbid	14 November 2012	Shot by the police during a protest. State-run Jordan News Agency reported that he was one of the "gunmen" died in a shootout when a group of them attacked a police station in the northern city of Irbid. But the father of Qais said his son did not carry a weapon and did not attack police.
Ahmad Al Maqableh	31	Jerash	30 November 2012	Shot in the head when a police centre in Amman came under shooting during country-wide protest on 14 November. He died of his wounds at Al Hussein Medical Centre 16 days later where he had been receiving treatment.

== Response ==
=== Domestic response ===
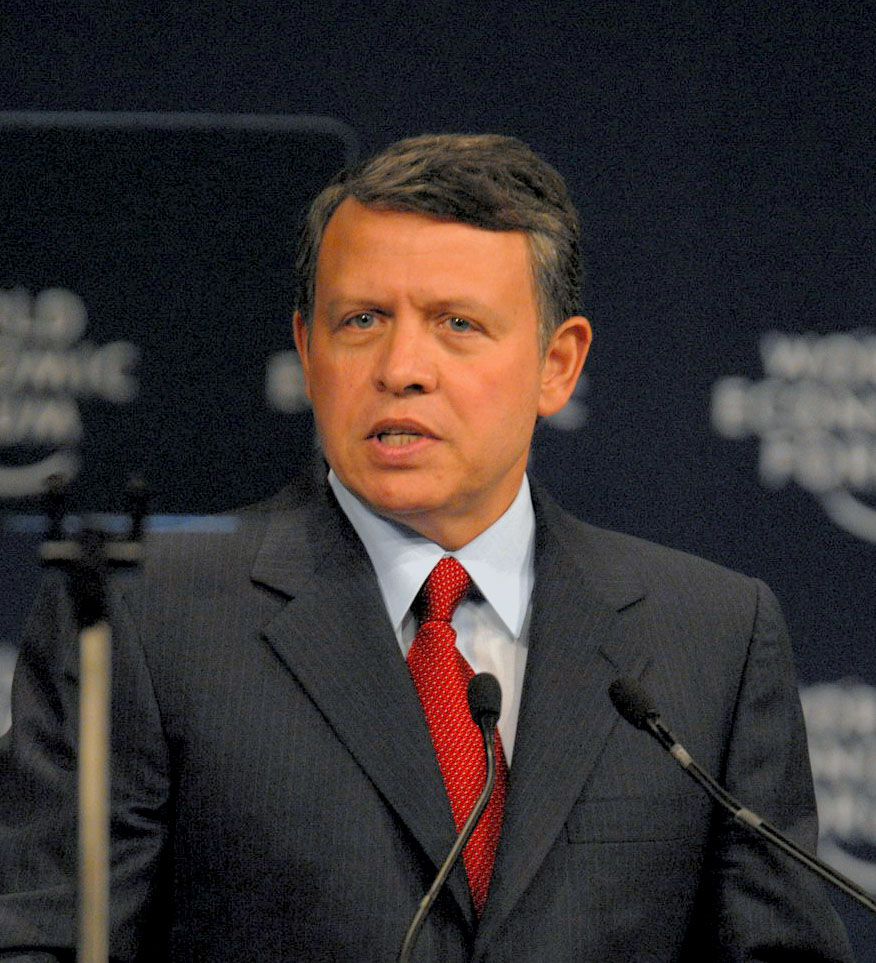
King Abdullah II

On 1 February, the Royal Palace announced that King Abdullah II had sacked the government as a consequence of the street protests and had asked Marouf al-Bakhit, an ex-army general, to form a new cabinet. Abdullah told al-Bakhit his authority will be to "take quick, concrete and practical steps to launch a genuine political reform process,". The reforms should put Jordan on the path "to strengthen democracy," and provide Jordanians with the "dignified life they deserve," the monarch said. He also asked al-Bakhit for a "comprehensive assessment ... to correct the mistakes of the past." and also the statement said Abdullah demanded an "immediate revision" of laws governing politics and public freedoms.

Bakhit stated that opposition groups, both Islamist and leftists, might possibly be included in the new government, but the Islamic Action Front immediately rejected that offer, stating that the current political conditions did not allow for them to join the government and that they were looking for real reform. Despite calls to stay away from the new government, the Islamic Action Front and five leftists were represented in a new government sworn in on 10 February.

There were also talks of reforming electoral law to reduce gerrymandering in constituency boundaries and guarantee greater proportionality. Taher Odwan, formerly editor-in-chief of Al Arab Al Yawm, a Jordanian newspaper, that was critical towards the government, was appointed minister of media affairs and communications. Odwan pledged enhanced press freedoms and access to information. A$500m package of price cuts in fuel and staples, including sugar and rice, was announced, along with salary increases for civil servants and the military.

On 11 February, following Egyptian President Hosni Mubarak's resignation, the Muslim Brotherhood stated that "Arab regimes should learn a lesson from what has happened [in Egypt]."

On 15 February, the Public Gatherings Law was reformed to allow unrestricted freedom of expression; the former law required permission from the governor to hold demonstrations. A reform of the electoral law was also promised.

On 15 March, King Abdullah II said a 53-member committee with government officials and opposition leaders would draft new laws for parliamentary elections and political parties, setting a three-month deadline for agreement on political reforms. However, the Muslim Brotherhood said it would not take part unless parliament is dissolved and a prime minister is elected from a parliamentary majority.

On 28 March, three days after deadly clashes between protesters and supporters of the king, King Abdullah II called for national unity, telling his citizens to avoid "any behaviour or attitude that would affect our unity." He went on to state that economic and political reforms were on their way. However, the Parliament rejected calls to reduce the king's power. As a response to the same violent clashes, 15 members of the government-appointed committee for national dialogue quit, effectively suspending its activity, although 12 of them retracted their resignations following a meeting with the king. The government decided to ban its supporters from demonstrating in the capital, while the opposition was allowed to demonstrate in specially designated areas in Amman.

On 12 June, in a television speech commemorating 12 years on the throne, the king said he would relinquish his right to appoint prime ministers and cabinets, instead, elected parliamentary majority would be the ones to form future cabinets. He also said that more reforms would be announced in the future, including new election and political party laws.

Prime minister Al Bakhit resigned on 17 October, after 70 of 120 deputies had called for his resignation for failing to swiftly implement the political reform package. King Abdullah appointed Awn al-Khasawneh as the new prime minister.

In April 2012, Prime Minister Awn al-Khasawneh resigns abruptly, was unable to satisfy either demands for reform or establishment fears of empowering the opposition. King Abdullah appointed former prime minister Fayez al-Tarawneh to succeed him.

On 4 October 2012, King Abdullah II dissolves the parliament for new early elections, and appointed Abdullah Ensour as the new prime minister of Jordan.

=== International response ===
United States – State Department spokesman Mark Toner says the Obama administration believes King Abdullah II is on the "right track" despite the protests, ""We call on protestors to do so peacefully. We support King Abdullah II's roadmap for reform and the aspirations of the Jordanian people to foster a more inclusive political process that will promote security, stability as well as economic development."

== See also ==
- 1989 Jordanian protests
- 2018 Jordanian protests
- November 2012 uprising in Jordan
- 1996 Jordanian protests
