= Sharaf =

Sharaf may refer to:

== People ==
- Sharaf (name), list of people with the name

== Places ==
- Sharaf, Kermanshah, Iran
- Bostan Rud Sharaf, Iran
- Sharaf, part of Sanaa Governorate

== Other uses ==
- Sharaf is part of the honor codes of the Bedouin
- Sharaf (magazine) (1882–1891), Persian-language magazine
- Sharaf (novel), 1997 novel by the Egyptian writer Sonallah Ibrahim
- Sharaf Order (Azerbaijani: Şərəf ordeni), the Order of Pride, Azerbaijan
- Pencak silat, a Muslim martial art

== See also ==
- Ash sharaf (disambiguation)
- 5543 Sharaf, a minor planet
- Sharaf al-Din (disambiguation)
