= Abdelraouf Rawabdeh =

Jordanian politician (born 1939)

- عبد الرؤوف الروابدة
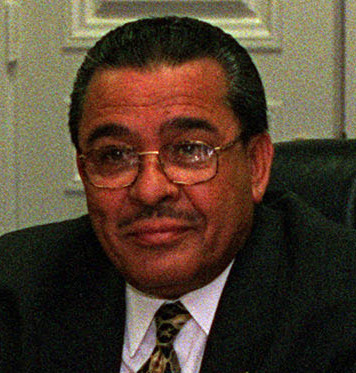
- Rawabdeh in 1999

President of the Senate
- In office 24 October 2013 – 25 October 2015
- Preceded by: Taher al-Masri
- Succeeded by: Faisal al-Fayez

Prime Minister of Jordan
- In office 4 March 1999 – 19 June 2000
- Monarch: King Abdullah II
- Preceded by: Fayez al-Tarawneh
- Succeeded by: Ali Abu al-Ragheb

Personal details
- Born: 18 February 1939 (age 87) Irbid, Transjordan
- Education: American University of Beirut

Abdelraouf Salem Nahar al-Rawabdeh (Arabic: عبد الرؤوف الروابدة; born 18 February 1939) is a Jordanian retired politician who served as the 32nd Prime Minister of Jordan from 4 March 1999 until 19 June 2000, a leading political figure from the northern city of Irbid in Jordan.

== Political experience ==
In 1983 Al-Rawabdeh became the Mayor of Amman and would serve in that position until 1989. In 1989 he then joined the Jordanian Parliament as a member of the 11th Parliament of Jordan, and again in 1993 and 1997 until 2001 in the 12th and 13th Parliament of Jordan respectively.

On 24 October 2013 he was named President of the Senate. Al-Rawabdeh is the first President of the enlarged Senate, which now has 75 members, where previously there had been 60 members. After his resignation, Al-Rawabdeh was replaced as President of the Senate by Faisal al-Fayez on 25 October 2015.

== See also ==
- List of prime ministers of Jordan

Political offices
| Preceded by Fayez al-Tarawneh | Prime Minister of Jordan; 1999–2000 | Succeeded by Ali Abu al-Ragheb |
