= Mudar Badran =

Jordanian politician (1934–2023)

His Excellency Mudar Badran
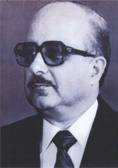
- Portrait in 1960

Prime Minister of Jordan
- In office 13 July 1976 – 19 December 1979
- Monarch: Hussein
- Preceded by: Zaid al-Rifai
- Succeeded by: Abdelhamid Sharaf
- In office 28 August 1980 – 10 January 1984
- Monarch: Hussein
- Preceded by: Kassim al-Rimawi
- Succeeded by: Ahmad Obeidat
- In office 7 December 1989 – 19 June 1991
- Monarch: Hussein
- Preceded by: Zaid ibn Shaker
- Succeeded by: Taher al-Masri

Personal details
- Born: Mudar Mohammad Ayesh Badran; 18 January 1934: Jerash, Emirate of Transjordan; (present-day Jordan)
- Died: 22 April 2023 (aged 89)
- Party: Independent
- Spouse: Mo'mina
- Children: 5
- Relatives: Adnan Badran (brother)
- Education: Damascus University

Mudar Mohammad Ayesh Badran (Arabic: مضر بدران; 18 January 1934 – 22 April 2023) was a Jordanian politician, government minister, and industrialist. He served as the 23rd Prime Minister of Jordan on three occasions from 1976 to 1979, then again from 1980 to 1984, and finally from 1989 to 1991.

== Biography ==
Badran was born in Jerash, Jordan (then the Emirate of Transjordan, a colony of the United Kingdom) in 1934 to Palestinian parents. His father hailed from Nablus. He studied at the Damascus University in French Syria and graduated as a lawyer. Badran started his career as a young officer in the Jordanian army. Later, he served as the director of the General Intelligence Directorate in the 1970s, during Black September. Following this troubled time, he became chief of the Hashemite Royal Court. He also served as Minister of Education.

Badran became Prime Minister of Jordan from 1976 to 1984, with a brief interruption from 1979 until 1980. He was appointed to the position again on 4 December 1989, replacing Zaid bin Shaker after his resignation. Badran's third term lasted until 1991, when Jordan once again became a democracy, and the Senate gained its legitimate powers again after two decades with no parliamentary elections. He served more than eight years as prime minister, which made him the longest-serving prime minister of Jordan. He also served as foreign minister from 1976 to 1979 and as defense minister for most of the time that he was prime minister. Badran was a close associate of King Hussein.

In 1993, he was appointed a member of the Senate. In 2011, he was given an honorary PhD in economics from the Hashemite University. Badran was also the target of a failed assassination attempt in Amman in February 1981 by the Syrian Defense Companies.

== Personal life ==
Badran's younger brother, Adnan Badran was prime minister of Jordan in 2005.

Badran lived in Abdoun neighborhood of Amman with his wife, Mo'mina. They had two sons and three daughters. His daughter, Reem Badran, served as a deputy in the House of Representatives.

Phasing out of political life, Badran headed to the private sector where he started a steel company, Jordan Steel P.L.C., in 1993. It became a leading steel manufacturer in the country.

== Death ==
Badran died on 22 April 2023, at the age of 89.

== See also ==
- List of prime ministers of Jordan

Political offices
Preceded by Zaid al-Rifai	Prime Minister of Jordan; 1976–1979	Succeeded by Abdelhamid Sharaf
Preceded by Kassim al-Rimawi	Prime Minister of Jordan; 1980–1984	Succeeded by Ahmad Obeidat
Preceded by Zaid ibn Shaker	Prime Minister of Jordan; 1989–1991	Succeeded by Taher al-Masri
