= 1996 Jordanian protests =

The 1996 Jordanian protests (Arabic: انتفاضة 1996 في الأردن) were mass protests and riots in Jordan for 2–4 weeks in August–September against new International Monetary Fund-led reforms, leading to bread-price hikes and despite economic troubles, the government of Prime Minister Abdul Karim Kabariti increased food prices and basic good prices hiked, sparking rioting in Karak and spread to Ma’an, Zarqa, Amman, Madaba and other southern cities, where poverty is high.

== Background ==
Jordan's history of food subsidies began with subsidies on wheat as well as other commodities to various sectors of society in the 1960s as to nurture loyalty to the Hashemite monarchy at a time of rapid growth and regional instability. Jordan's economy, for the entire history of the Hashemite Kingdom, has been dependent upon various sources of foreign aid, earlier from the Great Britain, and by the 1990s mostly from the United States and other Persian Gulf States. Substantial aid from Saudi Arabia dried up when King Hussein continued to support a bilateral alliance with Iraqi leader Saddam Hussein in the 1991 Gulf War also forcing many Jordanians working in the Persian Gulf States to return home where jobs were few.

In April 1989, seven years before the events of 1996, the Jordanian government implemented an IMF sponsored economic adjustment and austerity plan that cut food subsidies sparking violent protests. The protests sparked in 1989 and in 1996 appear identical in terms of government policy and public response, they differ considerably in terms of the Jordanian state's reaction to the unrest. Response to the unrest of the 1989 protests that saw the Hashemite regime government relent to the demonstrators demands, sacking the government and reforming electoral laws would differ from the response in 1996 where the king stood behind the government, offered no concessions and, to the contrary, threatened to use any means necessary to quell the disturbances.

In 1996, Karim Kabariti was appointed Prime Minister of Jordan and entered into a political situation marked by a period of recovery from the domestic and regional crises that had surrounded the preceding protests in 1989. Jordan was stabilizing its economic situation, distancing itself from the regime of Saddam Hussein, signing peace with Israel, and rapproaching the United States, the Gulf States, and Saudi Arabia. In effect Jordan had become an enthusiastic participant in the "New World Order" predicating itself in economic liberalization.

By early 1996 the preceding government had introduced a 5% sales sax and ended an economic boycott on Israel, meaning all requirements of the IMF program had been met except for the lifting of the subsidies. Unofficial estimates in 1995 held that the Jordanian government subsidized almost $380 million in food items, including $147 million for wheat products alone. Increases in wheat prices on the international market saw a sharp increase in subsidies, according to Prime Minister Kabariti the government had only budgeted around $53 million for subsidies, thus creating a deficit unacceptable to the IMF.

On August 13, 1996, the Jordanian government lifted its subsidies on wheat, its second major economic adjustment after the '89 measures, in cooperation with IMF policy causing all bread prices to immediately double. To offset the economic burden of the lifted subsidies, the government had created a subsidy of $1.80 per person per month to be paid directly to the head of each eligible household.

Though touted as part of the economic reform process in the country, the mechanisms and timing of this policy were also direct considerations of Kabariti's policy in Iraq. It was obvious to others in the government this would provoke unrest in the country, especially pro-Iraqi strongholds in the south, but this was Kabariti's intention so as to have basis for the arrest of the Ba'athist element of the country and sympathizers of Saddam Hussein.

A day after lifting the subsidies, an IMF donor meeting in Paris promised more than $1 billion to finance economic projects over the next three years. Japan also began negotiating a $90 million soft loan to finance Jordan's budget deficit.

== Protests ==
The first few days preceding the lifting of subsidies was met without incident. Protests would not begin until three days later on August 16, after Friday noon prayer more than 1,000 residents in Karak, Jordan began demonstrating. Rioters built roadblocks and set fire to several buildings with police responding with the use of tear gas. Poor and middle class-led protests erupted throughout the nation as countrywide rioting had turned into an opposition and unprecedented wave of political tensions and popular uprising. In al-Tafilah, protestors chanted antigovernment slogans and threw rocks until eventually dispersed by police and tear gas. In Ma'an, more than 300 demonstrators had to be dispersed similarly. Residents in Hay al-Tafaylah began a peaceful march when police appeared in full riot gear dispersing the march. The military was positioned outside the towns of Karak, Mazar, Ma'an, al-Tafilah, as well as around refugee camps.

The next day, two-dozen armored military vehicles, helicopters, and dozens of troop transporters entered Karak forcing demonstrators to retreat but still threw stones at soldiers from balconies and roofs. When the demonstrators were cleared, King Hussein gave a short speech that was broadcast on state television where he said he was "pained and saddened" by the violence but equally determined to crush the protest. Despite his speech, after returning to the capital, new clashes continued to break out and a curfew was imposed on Karak, residents were permitted to leave their homes only to buy necessary goods and all public gatherings were banned. The curfew would not be lifted until August 25 accompanied with military withdrawal.

The demonstrators called for the government to step down and the new IMF measures to be withdrawn. The protests would be the bloodiest and deadliest wave of anti-government violence and sustained strikes since the 1989 Jordanian protests, when 32 were killed during food riots.

After weeks of protests by thousands of civilians the deaths of 3 protesters, the prices of Grain and fodder decreased and the government made concessions with protesters, decreasing IMF-led programs and reforms. The Intifada’s main demands was for the government to resign, better conditions, withdrawal of austerity measures and food prices programs despite shortages and half of their demands was met. On November 12 King Hussein instructed the government to close the file on the riots and to release all of those who were still in prison for connected offences. All charges related to the incident were dropped. The affair undoubtedly played a part in the King's decision to sack Kabariti in March 1997.

== See also ==
- 2011-2012 Jordanian protests
- 1989 Jordanian protests
