= Abdul Karim Kabariti =

Prime minister of Jordan

Abdul Karim al-Kabariti
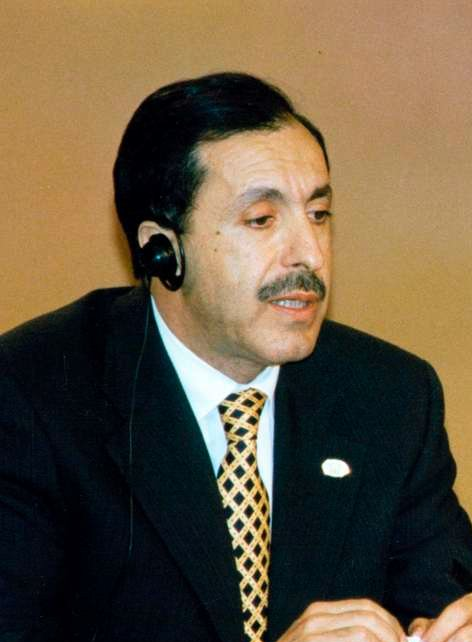
- Al-Kabariti in Madrid (November 1996)

Prime Minister of Jordan
- In office 4 February 1996 – 9 March 1997
- Monarch: King Hussein
- Preceded by: Zaid ibn Shaker
- Succeeded by: Abdelsalam al-Majali

Personal details
- Born: 15 December 1949 (age 76) Amman, Jordan
- Party: Independent

Abdul Karim al-Kabariti (/ˈɑːbdʊl kəˈriːm æl kɑːbəˈriːti/ AHB-duul kə-REEM al kah-bə-REE-tee; Arabic: عبد الكريم الكباريتي; born 15 December 1949) is a Jordanian politician and businessman who was the 30th Prime Minister of Jordan from 4 February 1996 to 9 March 1997.

== Early life and education ==
Kabariti was born in Amman, Jordan on 15 December 1949 to a prominent Aqaba family. He studied geology at the American University in Beirut and received his bachelor's degree in business and finance with honors from St. Edward's University in the United States, in 1973.

Kabariti was granted an Honorary Doctorate degree in Business Administration for his significant contribution to the financial sector across the Middle East and for his commitment to education and the political process in Jordan from Coventry University in 2015.

== Political career ==
Kabariti was elected as a Deputy to Jordan's 11th Parliament in 1989 and was quickly promoted to the cabinet in where he served as Minister of Tourism and Antiquities until 1991 and Minister of Labor from 1991 to 1993 before his appointment as Foreign Minister in 1995. Kabariti had earlier resigned from his post as Minister of Tourism and Antiquities during the Gulf Crisis in protest of what he viewed as a pro-Iraqi drift in the government.

Kabariti was a member of the Twelfth Jordanian Parliament in 1993–1997, during which he was the Head of the Economics and Finance committee for the period 1993–1995.

Kabariti's post as Foreign Minister saw an evolving foreign policy of peace with Israel, distance from Iraq, and rapprochement with former benefactors Saudi Arabia and Kuwait.

=== Prime Minister of Jordan ===
Kabariti was appointed in 1996 as Prime Minister, Foreign Minister, and Minister of Defense by the late King Hussein bin Talal, an unusually powerful combination. King Hussein instructed Kabariti to "effect a total and comprehensive overhaul of the state apparatus and its upper echelons and to propagate awareness among young people in a pure and white revolution." The appointment of Kabariti as prime minister may have been partly motivated by his potential for developing a good working relationship with parliament as he had served in the lower house since 1989 and held close personal and business relationships with its leadership.

Working relations with his parliament would actually end up deteriorating due to strong opposition in the legislature to his foreign policy and economic reforms. Kabariti became known for his positive attitude toward reform, openness toward journalists and his support of closer relationships with both Syria and Gulf Countries and less close relations with Iraq.

==== Regime change in Iraq ====
Though Kabariti spoke of his domestic platform as strengthening pluralism and democracy and fighting corruption in the Jordanian government, these promises became subservient to the real purpose of the Kabariti government, regime change in Iraq. Kabariti's personal ambition as prime minister was to secure the King's cooperation in covert operations to overthrow the regime of Saddam Hussein. Kabariti's promise to King Hussein to deliver regime change in Iraq was probably what won Kabariti his premiership in the first place. Throughout his terms both as foreign minister in 1995 and as prime minister Kabariti would take steps toward a coup against Saddam. Kabariti and King Hussein would meet several times in the United States where they were briefed by the CIA about plans for a military coup in Iraq in cooperation with the Iraqi National Congress (INA) led by Iyad Allawi. King Hussein was initially skeptical about the CIA's plans which the King viewed as half-baked and lacking basic knowledge of the internal situation in Iraq. It would take the personal persuasion of President Bill Clinton to sway King Hussein to support the coup. Kabariti would also forge a strategic relationship between Jordan and Saudi Arabia toward coordinated action against Saddam. Just weeks into the new government Kabariti had also allowed the INA to open headquarters in Amman.

The coup collapsed quickly when Iraqi intelligence intercepted a satellite communication device the CIA team in Amman had been using to communicate with plotters in Iraq, the interception of this device is attributed to the penetration of double agents within the INC. Another reason for the failure of the coup came from Allawi, the leader of the coup, who had granted an interview to the Washington Post, one of the few US publications Iraqi intelligence was sure to monitor, where he spoke of the forthcoming military coup. Shortly after the publication of the interview, Saddam Hussein had arrested key plotters in the military and informed the CIA team in Amman of the failure of their plans on the captured communication device.

==== Bread riots ====
On August 13, 1996, Kabariti's government lifted its subsidies on wheat. Kabariti argued that maintaining these subsidies created a deficit unacceptable to the IMF which Jordan relied on to be eligible for aid and relief from the west. The move immediately doubled the price of bread in the country. Protests broke out in the southern town of Kerak on August 16 and eventually spread to other towns, the riots were met with heavy police and military response. Though touted as part of the economic reform process in the country, the mechanisms of this policy were direct considerations of policy in Iraq. It was obvious to others in the government this would provoke unrest in the country, especially pro-Iraqi Jordanians, but this was Kabariti's intention so as to have basis for the arrest of the Ba'athist element of the country and sympathizers of Saddam Hussein. In response to the unrest King Hussein, likely unaware of the real motive behind the lifted subsidies, in a press conference doubled down his support for Kabariti's policies and placed blamed external elements supportive of Iraq for fermenting unrest.

==== Dismissal in 1997 ====
In the aftermath of the riots, King Hussein, evidently privy to the scheme, instructed the government to release all in prison for charges related to the disturbances in Kerak. The King did not immediately sack Kabariti for the handling of the riots but it undoubtedly played a part in his decision to dismiss him in March 1997. Kabariti was also a bitter political enemy of the Crown Prince Hassan bin Talal and came to support King Hussein's son Abdullah in the line of succession, so King Hussein's public expression of confidence of then Crown Prince Hassan also had influence on the decision of Kabariti's dismissal. After a little over a year as Prime Minister he was dismissed from office by King Hussein, replaced by former premier Abdel Salam Majali, and also left his post as Foreign Minister.

==== Post King Hussein era ====
In 1999, Kabariti became the first Chief of the Royal Court with King Abdullah II. He was dismissed less than a year later, owing to disagreements with King Abdullah and the then-prime minister over domestic and foreign policy issues.

Kabariti was also a member of the Jordanian Senate, First Deputy to the Speaker in 2000–2002, returning to the Senate, Head of the Economic & Finance Committee in 2005–2007.

== Business career ==
Kabariti serves on the boards of four banks and is the board president of Gulf Bank Algeria. He was board chair of Jordan Kuwait Bank until May 2021.

In 2021, leaked financial documents shared by the ICIJ known as the Pandora Papers revealed that Kabariti was linked to two offshore companies in the British Virgin Islands that had $1.5 million in accounts at Jordan Kuwait Bank in 2013. Kabariti told the ICIJ that he had not been "engaged in any illicit or illegal activities whether related to the two companies in question or otherwise" and his intention was to "invest solely in Jordanian stocks of banks operating in the country" adding that neither of his offshore companies were investigated by the Jordanian authorities. King Abdullah II and another former Jordanian prime minister Nader Dahabi were also implicated in the leaks.

== See also ==
- List of prime ministers of Jordan

Political offices
Preceded by Zaid ibn Shaker	Prime Minister of Jordan; 1996–1997	Succeeded by Abdelsalam al-Majali
