= Sharaf bin Rajeh =

Regent of Iraq

Emir of Taif
- In office 1915–1925

Regent of the Kingdom of Iraq
- In office 1 April 1941 – 1 June 1941
- Monarch: Faisal II
- Preceded by: Prince Abdullah
- Succeeded by: Prince Abdullah

Jordanian Senator
- In office 1950–1955

Personal details
- Born: 1881 Taif
- Died: 1955 (aged 73–74)
- Children: Abdelhamid Sharaf

Military service
- Allegiance: Kingdom of Hejaz
- Rank: Emir
- Battles/wars: Siege of Medina

Sharif Sharaf bin Rajeh (Arabic: شرف بن راجح; 1881–1955) was the regent of the Kingdom of Iraq from 1 April 1941 to 1 June 1941, as well as a Jordanian senator and the Emir of Taif until his death. He, a distant relative of the previous regent Abd al-Ilah, was appointed under Rashid Ali al-Gaylani to legitimize Golden Square control of Iraq.

== Biography ==
Sharaf bin Rajeh was born in Taif in 1881 as the heir of the emirship, in what was then Ottoman Arabia. He participated in the conquest of Asir against the Ottoman authorities during the Arab Revolt. Around the same time, he became the Emir of Taif, succeeding his father. He continued participation in the conflict by raiding train stations. He would lead the capture of Medina following the surrender of the Ottomans. He later moved to Iraq in 1925, where he had his son Abdelhamid Sharaf. In Iraq, he became the second regent.
In 1950, he moved to Amman and served on the Jordanian senate from 1950 to 1955. He died in 1955.

== As regent ==
To prevent his constitutional power from being levied to support the Golden Square, in 1941 Abd al-Ilah fled the royal palace. After this, Rashid Ali al-Gaylani was looking to bring in a new regent. He therefore called forward the distant royal relative of Sharaf bin Rajeh to legitimize the government. Abd al-Ilah was then indicted in absentia for 'trying to undermine the army, for harming national unity and for flouting the constitution.' This new government was recognized by the Germans, but not the British.
