= Islamic World Academy of Sciences =

- Abbreviation: IAS
- Formation: 1986
- Website: Official website

The Islamic World Academy of Sciences (IAS) is a non-profit organisation of scientists and technologists that works for the promotion of science and technology in the Islamic world. It was founded in 1986.

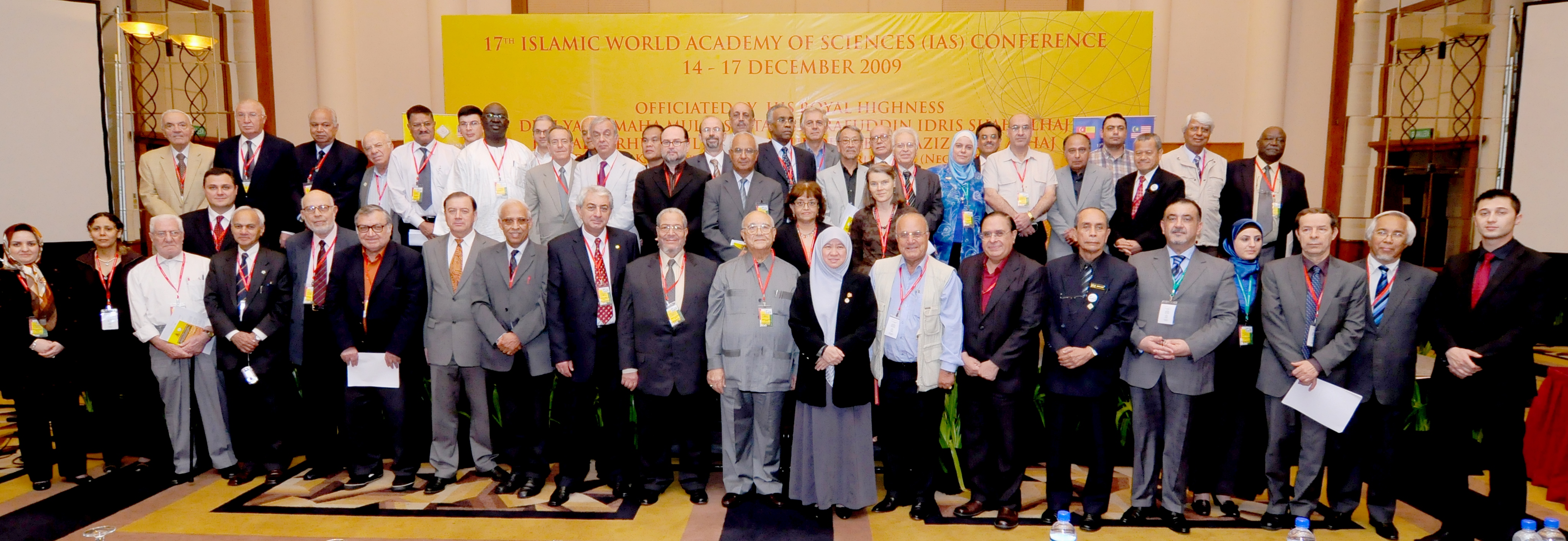
IAS Conference December 2009, Shah Alam, Selangor (Malaysia)

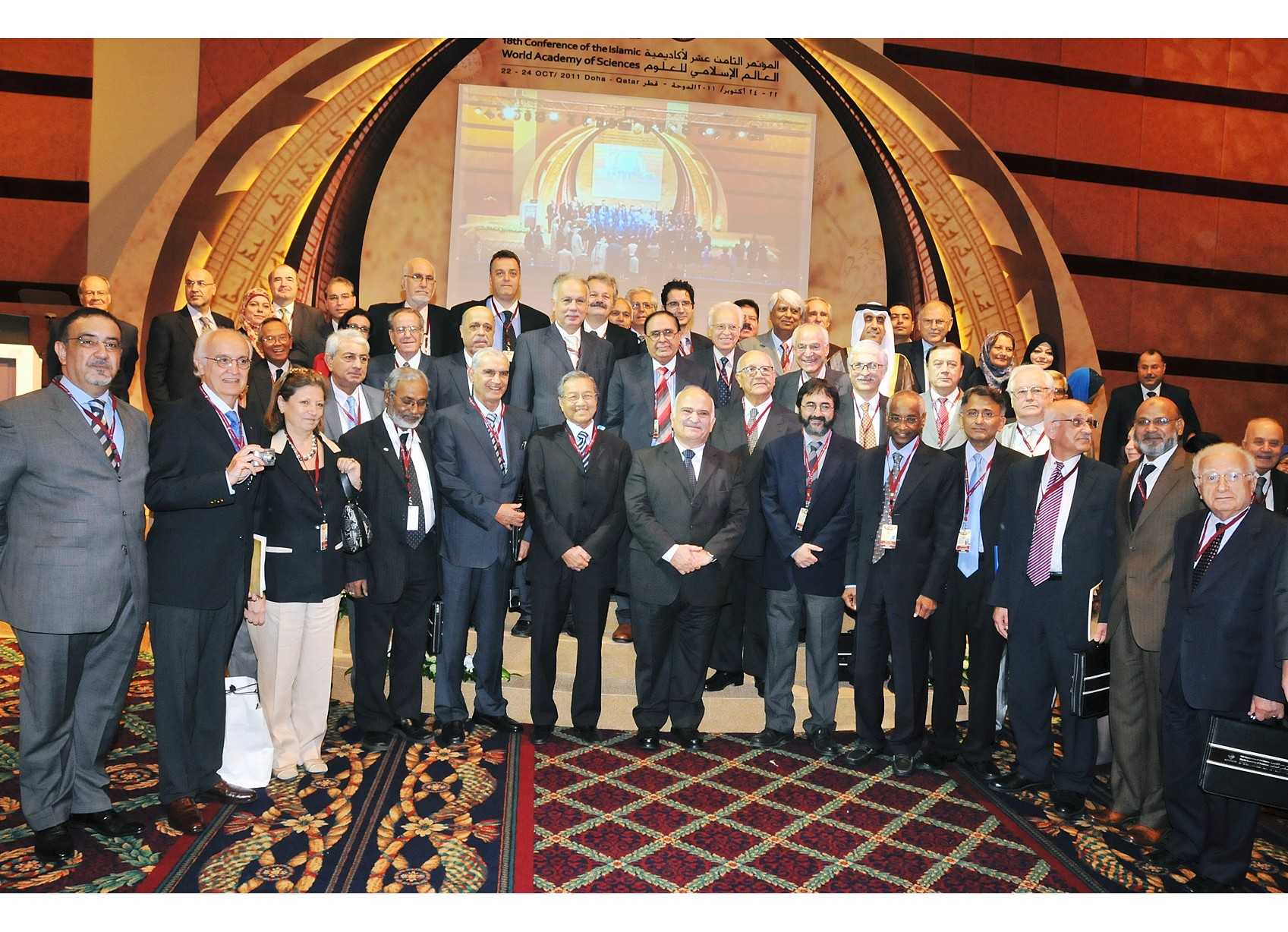
18th IAS Conference Doha - Qatar - October 2011

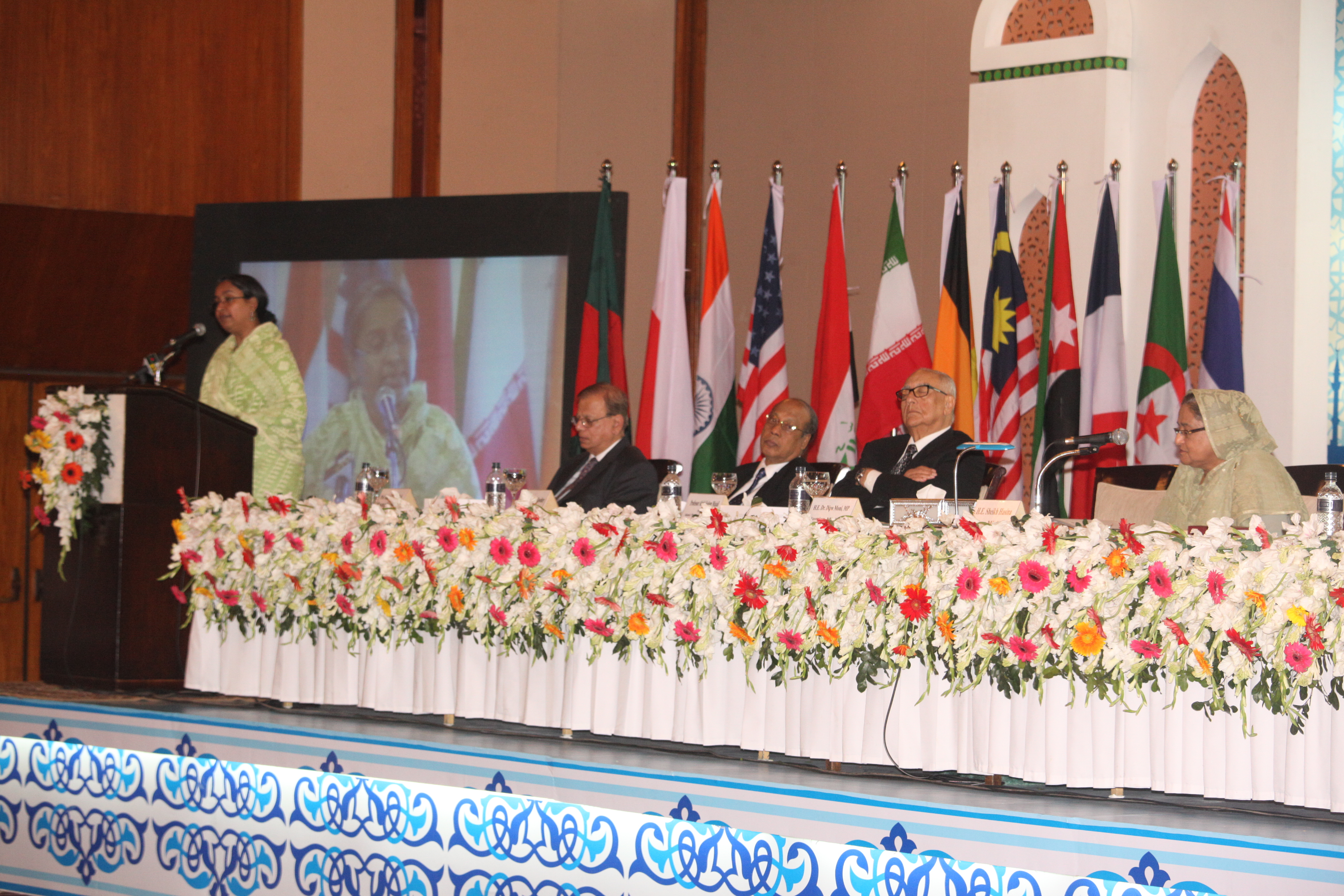
19th international science conference in Dhaka

== Foundation ==
The establishment of the Islamic World Academy of Sciences (IAS) was initially proposed by the Organisation of the Islamic Conference (OIC), now the Organisation of Islamic Cooperation) Standing Committee on Scientific and Technological Co-operation (COMSTECH), and approved by the Fourth Islamic Summit held in Casablanca in 1984.

Upon the invitation of Jordan, the Founding Conference of the Academy was held in Amman (Jordan) in October 1986, under the patronage of HRH Prince Al-Hassan, who accepted the patronage of the Academy together with HE the President of Pakistan. Operating from its Amman Secretariat, the Academy aims to continue the work it had started in 1986, assisting the decision-makers and scientists and technologists of the OIC-Member Countries and helping them achieve an advanced level of development for their countries.

== IAS Programme ==
=== General ===
The underlying objective of the programme of the Islamic World Academy of Sciences is to establish a framework for the development of science and technology in the Islamic World.

The programme, by facilitating interaction among scientists, and promoting the exchange of views and ideas on science and technology issues in particular, can catalyse the overall process of socio-economic development in Islamic countries.

Since its inception in 1986, the IAS has been implementing programmes that address serious contemporary issues facing the Islamic World, with the aim of formulating remedial policies that can be adopted by OIC and developing countries in their quest to achieve their development objectives.

Operating on a year to year basis, the IAS has organised several international conferences, published a series of conference proceedings, newsletters and some monographs, and has also established a quality scientific journal which is of an international standard.

Moreover, the IAS has established numerous contacts with national and international non-governmental organisations, as well as governments throughout the world.

The organization has published The Medical Journal of the Islamic World Academy of Sciences since August 1988. The IAS, through its Secretariat, regularly publishes the Newsletter of the Islamic World Academy of Sciences.

== Structure ==
The structure of the IAS consists of a General Assembly, Council, Headquarters, Fellows, Deceased Fellows and Ibrahim Award.

=== IAS General Assembly ===
The Academy itself is governed by the General Assembly in which all founding and elected Fellows are member. The there were 110 Academy Fellows on 1 December 2016. They represent more than 40 countries and many scientific disciplines. The Fellows of the Academy are eminent figures, each in their field has achieved a great deal and has contributed significantly both to their country’s development and the global arena. Since its establishment in 1986, the General Assembly has convened annually and the major issues discussed at each of these gatherings are the planning and accomplishing of future Academy activities.

=== IAS Council ===
The Council is responsible for the management and direction of the Academy and consists of eleven executive members which are elected by the General Assembly for a four-year term of office, and which is subject to its regulation and supervision.

Council of the Islamic World Academy of Sciences (2017–2021)

President:	Abdel Salam Majali	Jordan
Vice-President:	Noor Muhammad Butt	Pakistan
Vice-President:	Munir Ozturk	Turkey
Vice-President:	Khatijah Mohd Yusoff	Malaysia
Treasurer:	Adnan Badran	Jordan
Secretary General:	Ahmad Azad	Australia
Member:	Shamshir Ali	Bangladesh
Member:	Mohammed Asghar	France
Member:	Mostefa Khiati	Algeria
Member:	Amdoulla Mehrabov	Azerbaijan
Member:	Muthana Shanshal	Iraq
Member (Ex-officio):	Moneef R. Zou’bi	Jordan

=== IAS Headquarters ===
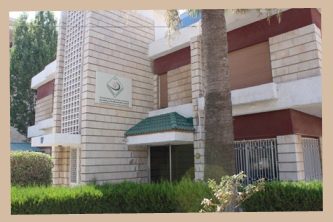
Islamic World Academy of Sciences IAS headquarter

Based in Amman, the capital of Jordan, the academy secretariat is the executive arm of the IAS and its primary function is to maintain the institutional establishment of the IAS and implement its plan of action within the guidelines set by the Council and General Assembly. The secretariat receives an annual maintenance grant and is provided with diplomatic immunities by the Jordanian government.
