= Leila A. Sharaf =

Jordanian politician (born 1940)

Leila A. Sharaf (Arabic: ليلى عبد الحميد شرف; born 1940) is a former member of the Jordanian Senate and Minister of Culture and Information of Lebanese descent. She is the widow of Abdelhamid Sharaf, the 24th Prime Minister of Jordan.

== Early life ==
Leila was born in 1940, in Beirut, Lebanon to Lebanese parents. She attended the American University of Beirut and completed her BA in 1959 and MA in Arab literature in 1965.

== Career ==
Sharaf is chair of the Board of Trustees of Philadelphia University (Jordan) and Palestine International Institution, beside being a trustee of American University of Beirut, Noor Al Hussein Foundation, Arab Open University, Kuwait, American Center of Oriental Research, King Hussein Foundation, and Arab Thought Forum. She has also been the president of Royal Society for the Conservation of Nature.

On the request of King Hussein of Jordan, Sharaf joined the Cabinet as the nation's first Minister of Culture and Information in 1984. Under her, Jordanian media saw some softening of restrictions on it. Ten months later, however, she resigned after Hussein reprimanded the media for "exceeding the limits of reality, knowledge, and responsibility". Her resignation was a bold move in a country where direct political opposition was not accepted and she was cited as "the only man in the Cabinet". Sharaf was made a senate member in 1989. She's also the Vice President of Arab Foundation for Modern Thought and helped establish the Cerebral Palsy Foundation in Jordan.

== Personal life ==
Leila married diplomat Abdelhamid Sharaf, a Hashemite and cousin of King Hussein of Jordan, in 1965; who later became the Prime Minister of Jordan. He died of a heart attack in 1980. They had two sons. She's a close confidant of Queen Noor of Jordan.
