= List of presidents of the Senate of Jordan =

The president of the Senate of Jordan is the presiding officer of the Senate of Jordan. The president is appointed by the king of Jordan by royal decree, and the term of the office is two years.

Below is a list of office-holders from 1947:

Name	Entered office	Left office	Notes
Tawfik Abu al-Huda	20 October 1947	30 May 1951	
Ibrahim Hashem	1 September 1951	4 December 1956	
Sa'id al-Mufti	4 December 1956	10 July 1963	
Sameer al-Rifai	10 July 1963	12 October 1965	
Sa'id al-Mufti	1 November 1965	23 November 1974	
Bahjat Talhouni	1 December 1974	20 January 1983	
Ahmed Abdul Karim Tarawneh	20 January 1983	11 January 1984	
Ahmad al-Lawzi	12 January 1984	8 June 1997	
Zaid al-Rifai	8 June 1997	17 December 2009	
Taher Nashat al-Masri	17 December 2009	24 October 2013	
Abdelraouf al-Rawabdeh	24 October 2013	25 October 2015	
Faisal al-Fayez	25 October 2015	Incumbent	
