= Samir Rifai =

Jordanian politician

Samir Z. Al-Rifai سمير الرفاعي
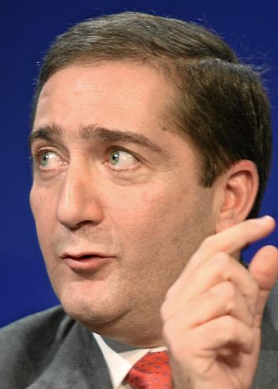
- Samir Rifai in 2010

Prime Minister of Jordan
- In office 14 December 2009 – 1 February 2011
- Monarch: Abdullah II
- Preceded by: Nader al-Dahabi
- Succeeded by: Marouf al-Bakhit

Personal details
- Born: 1 July 1966 (age 60) Amman, Jordan
- Party: Independent
- Relatives: Al-Rifai family
- Education: Harvard University; Trinity College, Cambridge

Samir Zaid al-Rifai (Arabic: سمير زيد الرفاعي) (born 1 July 1966) is a Jordanian politician who was the 38th Prime Minister of Jordan from 14 December 2009 to 9 February 2011, Vice President of the Senate of the Hashemite Kingdom of Jordan from 2015 till present. Prior to that, he was the Chairman of the Senate Foreign Relations Committee between 2013 and 2015.

Prior to his appointment as Prime Minister, Rifai was the head of Jordan Dubai International Capital.

He received a bachelor's degree at Harvard University and a master's degree at the University of Cambridge.

Rifai's father, Zaid Rifai, was a former prime minister, and president of the Senate of Jordan.

== See also ==
- List of prime ministers of Jordan

Political offices
Preceded by Nader al-Dahabi	Prime Minister of Jordan; 2009–2011	Succeeded by Marouf al-Bakhit
