= Ash sharaf =

Ash sharaf may refer to:

- Ash sharaf, San‘a’, Yemen
- Ash sharaf, Abyan, Yemen
