= Ahmad Obeidat =

Jordanian politician (1938–2026)

His Excellency Ahmad Obeidat
- أحمد عبيدات
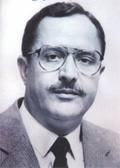

Prime Minister of Jordan
- In office 10 January 1984 – 4 April 1985
- Monarch: King Hussein
- Preceded by: Mudar Badran
- Succeeded by: Zaid al-Rifai

Personal details
- Born: 18 November 1938 Irbid, Emirate of Transjordan (present-day Jordan)
- Died: 2 February 2026 (aged 87) Amman, Jordan
- Education: University of Baghdad

Ahmad Abdul Majeed Obeidat (Arabic: أحمد عبدالمجيد عبيدات; 18 November 1938 – 2 February 2026) was a Jordanian politician and senior member of the Obeidat family. He served as the 26th Prime Minister of Jordan from 10 January 1984 to 4 April 1985.

== Early life and education ==
Obeidat was born on 18 November 1938 in Hartha, Bani Kinana District, Irbid Governorate, Jordan. He finished his secondary education in Nablus and earned a bachelor's degree from the University of Baghdad in 1961.

== Career ==
Obeidat held various positions in the Jordanian government throughout his career, including roles in education, law enforcement, and intelligence:

- Teacher, Ministry of Education (1957)
- Officer, Ministry of Finance, Customs Department (1962)
- Officer, Public Security Department (1962–1964)
- Officer, General Intelligence Department (1964–1974), with the rank of lieutenant general
- Director, General Intelligence Department (1974–1982)
- Minister of Interior (1982–1984)
- Prime Minister of Jordan (January 1984 – April 1985)

As prime minister, Obeidat oversaw the convening of the 17th Palestinian National Council in Amman and the signing of the Palestinian-Jordanian Joint Action Agreement. Following his tenure as prime minister, Obeidat was appointed to the Senate and remained active in public service and legal affairs.

He was a member of the Senate for several periods during his active time since 1984. Obeidat was first a member of the Jordan Bar Association since 9 July 1985; UNDP goodwill ambassador in 1990, founder and member of Jordan Environment Society 1986–2003, and was the chairman of the board of trustees; founding member and chairman of the Jordan National Society for Consumer Protection, 1989; chairman of the Royal Committee for Drafting the National Charter, 1990–1991; deputy chairman of the Royal Human Rights Commission, appointed on 23 March 2000; deputy chairman of the Royal Commission for Judicial Reform, appointed on 31 August 2000; chairman of the board of trustees of the National Center for Human Rights, 19 February 2003 – 1 July 2008; member of the board of trustees of the Arab Anti-Corruption Organization; attorney and legal consultant practicing in his private law firm ‘Obeidat Law’, one of the biggest law firms in the Middle East, as of 1985.

In May 2011, he launched the National Front for Reform.

== Death ==
Obeidat died in Amman on 2 February 2026, at the age of 87.

== See also ==
- List of prime ministers of Jordan

Political offices
Preceded by Mudar Badran	Prime Minister of Jordan; 10 January 1984 – 4 April 1985	Succeeded by Zaid al-Rifai
