= Nader Al-Dahabi =

Prime minister of Jordan

Nader Dahabi نادر الذهبي
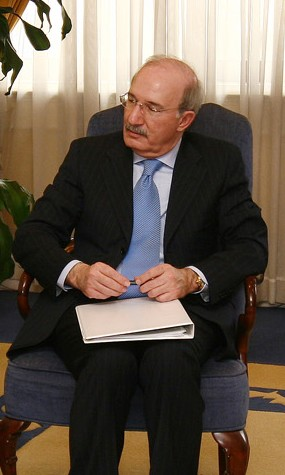

Prime Minister of Jordan
- In office 25 November 2007 – 14 December 2009
- Monarch: Abdullah II
- Preceded by: Marouf al-Bakhit
- Succeeded by: Samir Rifai

Personal details
- Born: 7 October 1946 (age 80) Amman, Jordan
- Party: Independent
- Education: Al Hussein College; Hellenic Air Force Academy; Cranfield University; Auburn University

Nader Dahabi (Arabic: نادر الذهبي; born 7 October 1946) is a Jordanian politician who was the 37th Prime Minister of Jordan from 25 November 2007 to 14 December 2009. He took office following the resignation of Marouf al-Bakhit, and days after the parliamentary elections in which Islamists and opposition were defeated by pro-regime candidates. On 9 December 2009, he handed in his resignation to King Abdullah II, along with the rest of his government.

Nader Dahabi is married with two sons and one daughter.

== Early life and education ==
Dahabi graduated from Al Hussein College in Amman in 1964. Then he joined the Royal Jordanian Air Force. Dahabi was sent on a scholarship to Greece where he received a degree in aeronautical engineering from the Hellenic Air Force Academy in 1969 and graduated top of his class. He also has a degree in aeronautical engineering from Cranfield Institute of Technology in the United Kingdom, and one in public administration from Auburn University in 1987.

Dahabi was born in 1946 in Jordan's capital, Amman, to a family of Syrian Damascene descent. He graduated from Al Hussein College in 1964. He joined the Royal Jordanian Air Force (RJAF) in 1964. Dahabi has degrees from the Hellenic Air Force Academy, Cranfield Institute of Technology, and Auburn University. Dahabi became an Assistant Commander in the RJAF in 1991. In 1994 he became CEO of Royal Jordanian Airlines, a position he left in 2001. Dahabi served as chairman of the Arab Air Carriers' Organization from 1994 to 1995. He became the first Arab to serve as president of the International Air Transport Association in 1996. Dahabi also has been chairman of the Board of Royal Jordanian Falcons since 1994, and is a member of the board of the Royal Jordanian Academy.

== Government ==
In 2001, Dahabi was appointed Minister of Transport by prime minister Ali Abu al-Ragheb. He left the post in 2003. In March 2004, Dahabi was appointed the Chief Commissioner of the Aqaba Special Economic Zone Authority, a special economic zone established in 2001 on the Red Sea city of Aqaba.

== As prime minister ==
On 25 November 2007, Dahabi was appointed Prime Minister of Jordan after the resignation of the office's previous holder, Marouf al-Bakhit. As prime minister, Dahabi's focus was on improving Jordan's economy.

During his tenure as prime minister, Dahabi attempted to implement reforms, but these were hindered by an unfriendly parliament. In 2009, halfway through Dahabi's four-year term, King Abdullah dissolved parliament and he resigned. He was replaced by Samir Rifai.

== After office ==
Dahabi was implicated in the Pandora Papers. The documents linked him to an offshore company in the British Virgin Islands.

== Family ==
Nader Dahabi's brother Mohammed was until January 2008 the head of the General Intelligence Directorate. In 2012, Mohammed Dahabi was sentenced to 13 years in prison.

== See also ==
- List of prime ministers of Jordan

Political offices
Preceded by Marouf al-Bakhit	Prime Minister of Jordan; 2007–2009	Succeeded by Samir Rifai
