= Abdelhamid Sharaf =

Prime Minister of Jordan (1939–1980)

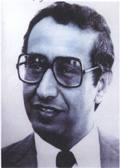

Prime Minister of Jordan
- In office 19 December 1979 – 3 July 1980
- Monarch: Hussein
- Preceded by: Mudar Badran
- Succeeded by: Kassim al-Rimawi

Personal details
- Born: 8 July 1939 Baghdad, Kingdom of Iraq
- Died: 3 July 1980 (aged 40) Amman, Jordan
- Spouse: Leila A. Sharaf
- Parent: Sharaf bin Rajeh (father)

Abdelhamid Sharaf (Arabic: الشريف عبدالحميد شرف; 8 July 1939 – 3 July 1980), was a Jordanian politician born in Iraq who served as the 24th Prime Minister of Jordan from December 1979 until his death of a heart attack after seven months in office. King Hussein announced the death in a live radio broadcast and said that "His death could not have come at a worse time." Sharaf was ambassador to the United States (1967–1972), Canada (1969–1972) and the United Nations (1972–1976).

== See also ==
- List of prime ministers of Jordan

Political offices
Preceded by Mudar Badran	Prime Minister of Jordan; 1979–1980	Succeeded by Kassim al-Rimawi
