= Sharaf, Kermanshah =

Sharaf شرف
- Village
- Location within Iran
- Coordinates: 34°24′45″N 46°44′20″E
- Country: Iran
- Province: Kermanshah
- County: Kermanshah
- Bakhsh: Mahidasht
- Rural District: Chaqa Narges

Population (2006)
  - Total: 99
- Time zone: UTC+3:30 (IRST)
  - Summer (DST): UTC+4:30 (IRDT)

Sharaf (Persian: شرف, also Romanized as Sharaf and Sheraf; also known as Sharafābād) is a village in Chaqa Narges Rural District, Mahidasht District, Kermanshah County, Kermanshah Province, Iran. At the 2006 census, its population was 99, in 22 families.
