= Marouf al-Bakhit =

Jordanian politician (1947–2023)

- معروف البخيت
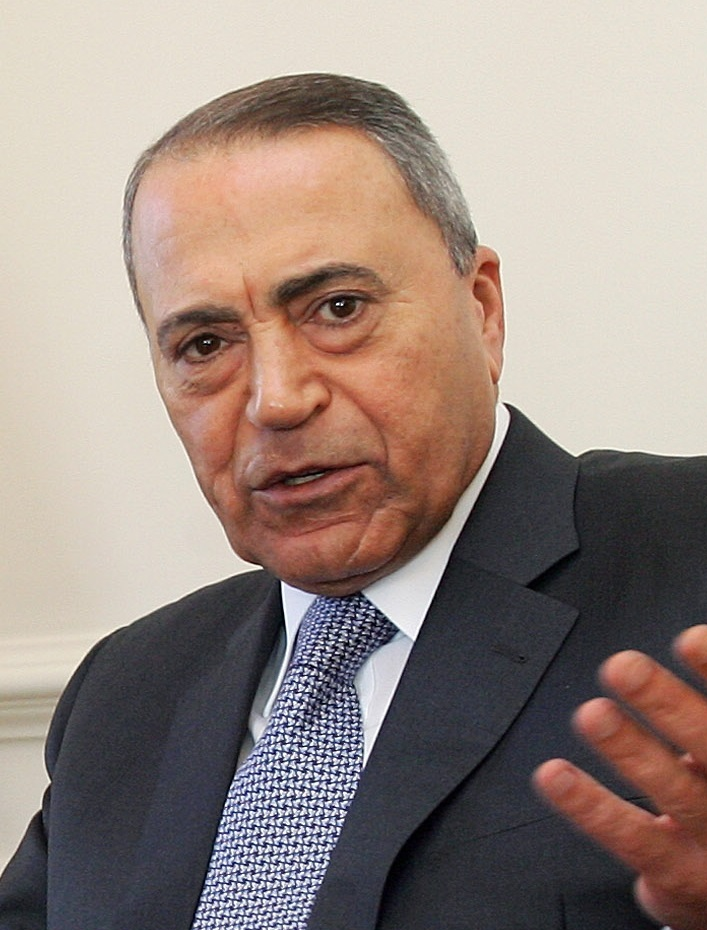
- al-Bakhit in 2011

Prime Minister of Jordan
- In office 9 February 2011 – 24 October 2011
- Monarch: Abdullah II
- Preceded by: Samir Rifai
- Succeeded by: Awn Al-Khasawneh
- In office 27 November 2005 – 25 November 2007
- Monarch: Abdullah II
- Preceded by: Adnan Badran
- Succeeded by: Nader al-Dahabi

Personal details
- Born: 18 March 1947 Mahis, Jordan
- Died: 7 October 2023 (aged 76)
- Party: Independent
- Education: University of Jordan; University of Southern California; King's College, London

Military service
- Allegiance: Jordan
- Branch/service: Jordanian Armed Forces
- Years of service: 1964–1999
- Rank: Major General

Marouf Suleiman al-Bakhit (Arabic: معروف البخيت; 18 March 1947 – 7 October 2023) was a Jordanian politician who was twice prime minister. He first served as prime minister from 27 November 2005 until 25 November 2007 and then again from 9 February 2011 to 17 October 2011. Bakhit also held the position of Jordanian ambassador to Israel and the national security chief. Appointed prime minister by King Abdullah II less than three weeks after the 2005 Amman bombings, Bakhit's main priorities were to maintain security and stability in Jordan. He was reappointed prime minister by the King on 1 February 2011, following weeks of protests.

Al-Bakhit resigned from his post on 17 October 2011, and was succeeded by Awn Al-Khasawneh on 24 October.

== Education ==
Marouf al-Bakhit graduated with a bachelor's degree in General Management and Political Science from University of Jordan. He also earned a Master of Public Administration from the University of Southern California in 1982, and a PhD in Strategic Studies from King's College London in 1990. His PhD thesis was entitled "The Evolution of Egyptian Air Defence Strategy 1967-1973".

== Military career ==
Marouf al-Bakhit comes from Jordan's Al-Abbadi Tribe. He joined the Jordanian Armed Forces in 1964, and graduated from the Royal Military College in 1966 as Second Lieutenant. He retired from the Armed Forces in 1999 as Major General.

== Prime minister ==
Bakhit was Prime Minister twice, first from 27 November 2005 until 25 November 2007, and then from 9 February 2011.

=== First term ===
Bakhit was appointed by King Abdullah II less than three weeks after the 2005 Amman bombings. The 2005 Amman bombings were a series of coordinated bomb attacks on three hotels in Amman, Jordan, on 9 November 2005. The attacks killed 60 people and injured 115 others.

After two years of trying to get reforms through the parliament, followed by a questionable election, he resigned and was replaced by Nader al-Dahabi.

=== Second term ===
After two weeks of street protests, on 1 February 2011 King Abdullah fired his prime minister, Samir Rifai, and re-appointed Bakhit to his old position. While continuing to maintain a moderate stance in respect to the United States and the 1994 Jordan-Israel peace treaty, al-Bakhit has promised to effect changes in election laws, decentralize authority and grant further rights to political parties.

King Abdullah II accepted his resignation on 17 October 2011 and appointed Awn Al-Khasawneh as Prime Minister.

=== Career highlights ===
- Member of the Jordanian Delegation for Israel-Jordan peace treaty
- Lecturer of political science at Mutah University (1997–1999)

== Death ==
Marouf al-Bakhit died on 7 October 2023, at the age of 76.

== See also ==
- List of prime ministers of Jordan

Political offices
Preceded by Adnan Badran	Prime Minister of Jordan; 2005–2007	Succeeded by Nader al-Dahabi
Preceded by Samir Rifai	Prime Minister of Jordan; 2011	Succeeded by Awn Al-Khasawneh
