= Kassim Rimawi =

Palestinian-Jordanian politician

Kassim al-Rimawi قاسم الريماوي
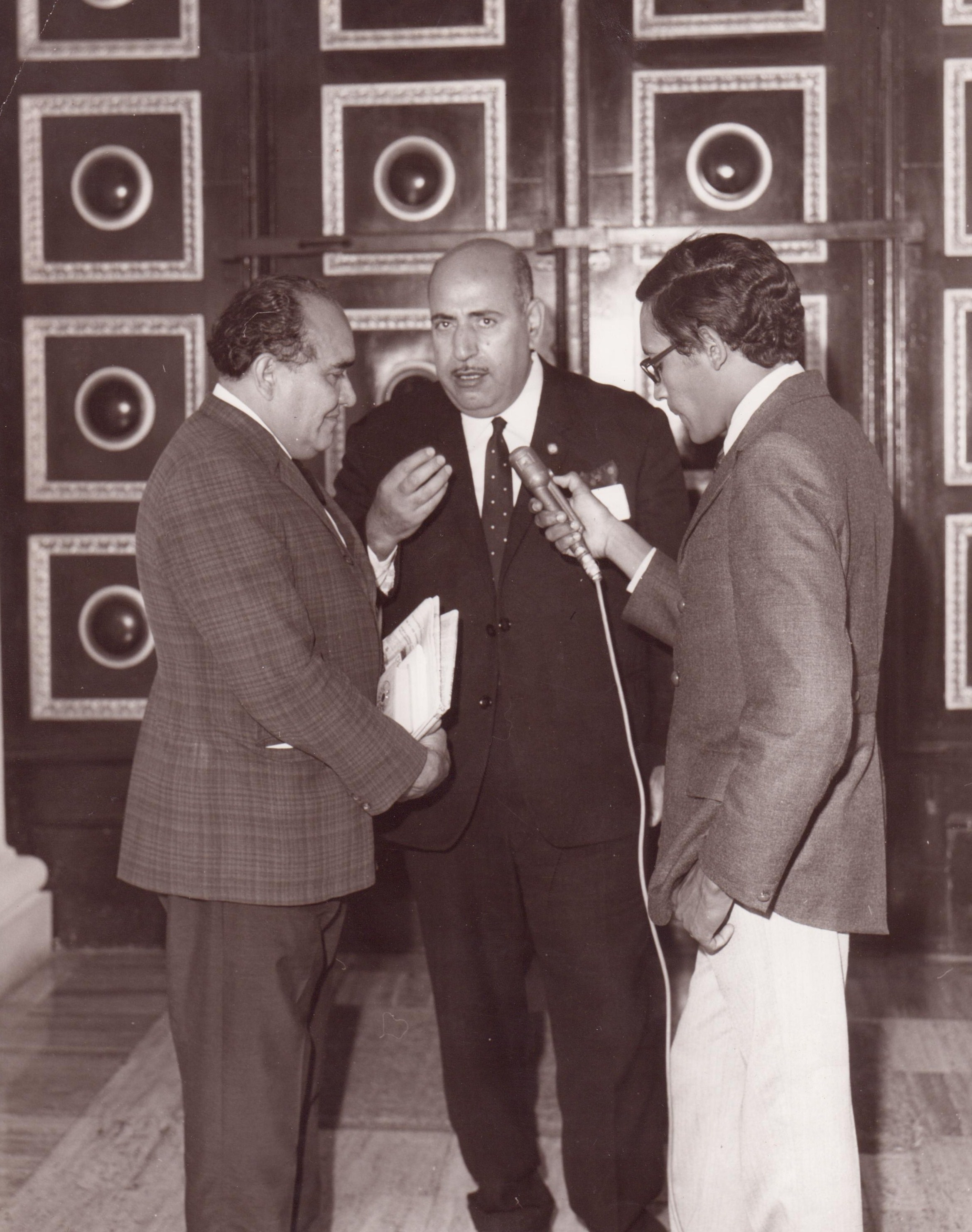

Prime Minister of Jordan
- In office 3 July 1980 – 28 August 1980
- Monarch: Hussein
- Preceded by: Abdelhamid Sharaf
- Succeeded by: Mudar Badran

Personal details
- Born: 11 January 1918 Beit Rima, British Mandate of Palestine
- Died: 29 April 1982 (aged 64) Amman, Jordan
- Party: Independent

Kassim al-Rimawi (Arabic: قاسم الريماوي; 11 January 1918 – 29 April 1982) was a Jordanian politician and statesman who served as the 25th Prime Minister of Jordan from 3 July 1980 to 28 August 1980. He was born in Beit Rima under Occupied Enemy Territory Administration.

- 28 January 1962 to 13 October 1962 - Minister of Agriculture and Construction.
- 2 December 1962 to 27 March 1963 - Minister of Agriculture.
- 31 July 1965 to 23 December 1966 - Minister of Interior and urban and rural affairs.
- 22 December 1966 to 4 March 1967 - Minister of Interior and urban and rural affairs.
- 27 June to 15 September 1970 - Minister of Interior and urban and rural affairs.
- 19 December 1979 to 3 July 1980 - Minister of Agriculture.

He was the Speaker of the House of Representatives of Jordan from 1967 to 1970.

== Education ==
- Doctorate in economics and education from Columbia University in New York in 1956
- Master's degree from the same university in 1954 (he was a professor at this university in 1953 for Management Sciences and Social Affairs)
- Bachelor's degree in sociology from the American University in Cairo in 1952
- Intermediate Certificate in Law from the University of London

== See also ==
- List of prime ministers of Jordan

Political offices
| Preceded by Abdelhamid Sharaf | Prime Minister of Jordan; 1980 | Succeeded by Mudar Badran |
