= Awn Al-Khasawneh =

39th Prime Minister of Jordan

- عون الخصاونة
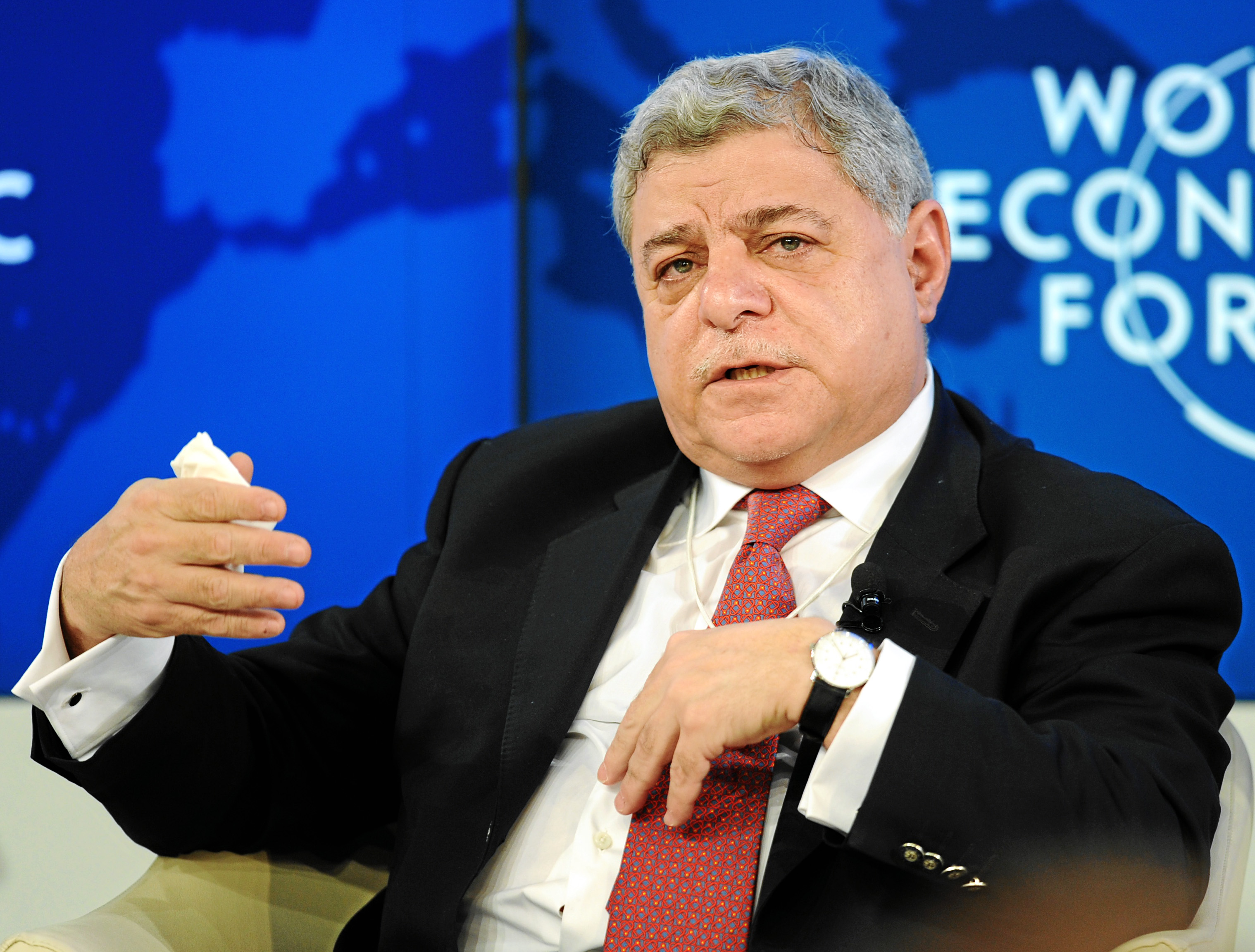

39th Prime Minister of Jordan
- In office 24 October 2011 – 2 May 2012
- Monarch: Abdullah II
- Preceded by: Marouf al-Bakhit
- Succeeded by: Fayez al-Tarawneh

Vice President of the International Court of Justice
- In office 2006–2009
- President: Rosalyn Higgins
- Preceded by: Raymond Ranjeva
- Succeeded by: Peter Tomka

Personal details
- Born: 22 February 1950 (age 76) Amman, Jordan
- Party: Independent
- Education: Queens' College, Cambridge

Awn Shawkat Al-Khasawneh (Arabic: عون الخصاونة; born 22 February 1950) is a Jordanian former politician and judge who was the 39th Prime Minister of Jordan, serving from October 2011 to April 2012. He was also formerly a judge of the International Court of Justice.

== Early life and education ==
Al-Khasawneh was born in Amman on 22 February 1950. Khasawneh received his primary education at the Islamic College in Jordan. He received his university education at Queens' College, Cambridge in England, where he attained a bachelor's degree in history and law. He also received a master's degree in international law from the same university.

== Career ==
From 1980 until 1990, Al-Khasawneh held senior legal posts in the Jordanian ministry of foreign affairs. From 1991 to 1994, he was legal adviser to the Jordanian delegation to the peace negotiations between Israel and Jordan.

In 1995, Al-Khasawneh became adviser to King Hussein and adviser of the State on international law with the rank of cabinet minister. He was appointed chief of the Royal Hashemite Court from 1996 to 1998. Khasawneh has also been a member of numerous international law bodies during his career.

He was elected to the International Court of Justice in 1999 and re-elected in 2008. He served in this post from 6 February 2000 to 31 December 2011. He also served as vice-president of the Court from 2006 to 2009. He resigned from the Court by letter dated 20 November 2011.

On 17 October 2011, he was appointed by King Abdullah II as prime minister of Jordan, replacing Marouf al-Bakhit (who had been accused of corruption during an earlier tenure as prime minister). The Guardian reported that Khasawneh has a reputation as a clean politician and is a noted legal expert.

On 26 April 2012, Al-Khasawneh submitted his resignation to King Abdullah, who, in turn, accepted the resignation. Fayez al-Tarawneh succeeded Khasawneh as prime minister.

In November 2016, Al-Khasawneh was appointed by United Nations Secretary-General Ban Ki-moon to the High-Level Panel on Access to Medicines, co-chaired by Ruth Dreifuss, former President of Switzerland, and Festus Mogae, former President of Botswana.

In 2017, Al-Khasawneh was appointed Judge Ad-Hoc at the International Court of Justice in the Case of Delimitation in the Caribbean and Pacific (Costa Rica v Nicaragua) joined with the Case of Construction of a Road in Costa Rica along the San Juan River (Nicaragua v Costa Rica). He has also been appointed an arbitrator.

Al-Khasawneh publishes and lectures on a variety of issues of international law at prominent universities worldwide.

== Honours ==
Order of Independence (Jordan), First Class (1993); Kawkab Order, First Class (1996); Nahda Order, First Class (1996) (Jordan). Légion d'Honneur, Grand Officier (1997) (France) International Jurists Award, 2009.

== See also ==
- Awn Shawkat Al-Khasawneh's cabinet
- Bisher Al-Khasawneh

Political offices
Preceded by Marouf al-Bakhit	Prime Minister of Jordan; 2011–2012	Succeeded by Fayez al-Tarawneh
