= Adnan Badran =

Jordanian academic and former prime minister

- عدنان بدران
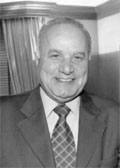

Prime Minister of Jordan
- In office 6 April 2005 – 27 November 2005
- Monarch: Abdullah II
- Preceded by: Faisal al-Fayez
- Succeeded by: Marouf al-Bakhit

Personal details
- Born: 15 December 1935 (age 90) Jerash, Transjordan, British Empire
- Party: Independent
- Spouse: Maha Badran
- Profession: Biologist

Adnan Badran (Arabic: عدنان بدران; born 15 December 1935) is a Jordanian politician and academic. He was the 35th Prime Minister of Jordan from 6 April 2005 to 27 November 2005.

== Early life and education ==
Badran was born in Jerash, Jordan (then located in the Emirate of Transjordan, a part of the British Empire) on 15 December 1935 to Palestinian parents. His father was from Nablus in Palestine. He received his bachelor of science from Oklahoma State University (1959) and his MS and PhD degrees from Michigan State University (1963). Badran's brother, Mudar Badran, was a politician in Jordan and served as prime minister several times.

== Professor and politics ==
In 1987, Badran was appointed first Secretary General of the country's Higher Council for Science and Technology, the president of which is Prince Hassan.

He was agriculture minister and education minister briefly during the late 1980s. During the 1990s he became president of the Arab Academy of Sciences and the Philadelphia University of Jordan, positions that he still holds. From 1994 to 1998, he was deputy director of UNESCO.

Badran was appointed prime minister on 7 April 2005 by King Abdullah II as part of a new government which was to be more reformist than previous governments. Badran also became defense minister in the new government. After seven months, however, he and his government resigned over the slow progress of reforms and the frustration caused by the hotel bombings in Amman on 9 November 2005.

Badran is currently the President of the Islamic World Academy of Sciences (IAS), he previously served as Treasurer during (1999 - 2023). Badran was the president of Petra University. In September 2014, he became Chancellor at the university. He was the president of Yarmouk University. Badran is a Fellow and former Vice-President of The World Academy of Sciences. In July 2009, Badran with Moneef R. Zou'bi published the UNESCO Science Report 2010 on the Arab States. Badran was awarded Honorary Doctorates by Sungkyunkwan University (1981), Michigan State University (2007), and Yarmouk University (2014). He is the author of 120 publications, including 22 books, and holds 4 patents.

== Personal life ==
Badran resides in Dabouq. He has six children and eight grandchildren. On 1 April 2019, Badran's wife, Maha, died after a long illness at age 67.

== See also ==
- List of prime ministers of Jordan

Political offices
Preceded by Faisal al-Fayez	Prime Minister of Jordan; 2005	Succeeded by Marouf al-Bakhit
