= Faisal Al-Fayez =

Prime minister of Jordan

His Excellency Faisal Al-Fayez
- فيصل الفايز
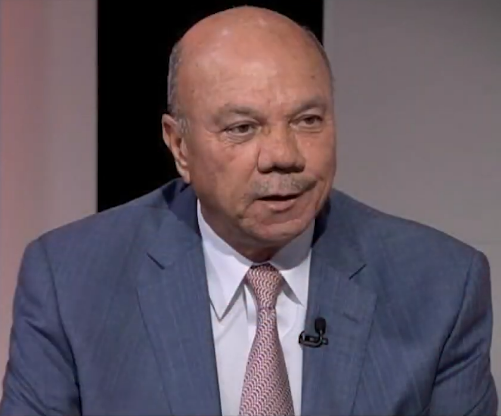

President of the Senate
- Incumbent
- Assumed office 25 October 2015
- Monarch: Abdullah II
- Preceded by: Abdelraouf al-Rawabdeh

Prime Minister of Jordan
- In office 25 October 2003 – 5 April 2005
- Preceded by: Ali Abu al-Ragheb
- Succeeded by: Adnan Badran

Speaker of the House of Representatives
- In office 2010–2011
- Monarch: Abdullah II
- Preceded by: Abdul Hadi al-Majali
- Succeeded by: Abdul Karim al-Doghmi

Head of the Royal Hashemite Court
- In office 5 April 2005 – 16 November 2005
- Monarch: Abdullah II
- Preceded by: Yousef Al Dalabih
- Succeeded by: Salem Al Turk

Personal details
- Born: 20 December 1952 (age 73) Amman, Jordan
- Spouse: Taroub Al Daoud
- Children: 3

Faisal Akef Al-Fayez (Arabic: فيصل عاكف مثقال الفايز; born 20 December 1952) is a Jordanian politician who was the 34th Prime Minister of Jordan from 25 October 2003 to 6 March 2005. Additionally, Al-Fayez is the only person in Jordanian history who was a Prime Minister, President of the Senate, President of the House of Representatives, and Head of the Royal Hashemite Court. He took office following the resignation of Ali Abu al-Ragheb. He previously served as Minister of Defense and is very close to King Abdullah II.

== Education ==
Al-Fayez was educated at the College De La Salle, Amman, Jordan (1970) and then went on to Cardiff University, United Kingdom, where he received a degree in political science in 1978. In 1981, he attained his master's degree in international relations from Boston University.

== Political career ==
Al-Fayez was Consul at the Embassy of Jordan in Brussels from 1979 until 1983. He then held the post of Assistant Chief of Royal Protocol at the Royal Court from February 1986 until 1995, when he was promoted to Deputy Chief of Royal Protocol at the Royal Court. Four years later, in 1999, he became Chief of Royal Protocol at the Royal Court.

In March 2003, Al-Fayez was appointed Minister and head of the Royal Hashemite Court. He subsequently served as Speaker of the House of Representatives in the 16th Parliament of Jordan in 2010. He has served as member of the Senate from 2007, and once again from 2013. He was appointed President of the Senate on 25 October 2015, replacing Abdelraouf al-Rawabdeh in that position. Al-Fayez was again appointed the President of the Senate on September 27, 2020, and a third time on the October 24th, 2024.

== Prime Minister (2003–2005) ==
In a royal letter of designation, Al-Fayez was tasked with acting on domestic, social, and economic reforms. This included increasing the level of freedom of the press and the public, social issues such as women and youth issues, and the lowering of the unemployment levels. Al-Fayez would trim down the cabinet from 29 members to 21, and his government would be the first in Jordanian history to have three women Cabinet Ministers.

In 2004, Al-Fayez's economic reforms helped increase Jordan's GDP per capita by 9.17%, the largest increase in GDP per capita in one year for Jordan's economy since 1992.

In January of that year, signed the multinational agreement for the second phase of the Arab Gas Pipeline, the second phase was focused on extending the pipeline from Jordan's southern border in Aqaba to its northern border at Rehab at a total cost of $350 million, bringing the total cost of the project to $1.2 billion. Al-Fayez signed the agreement alongside Rafiq Al-Hariri, Atef Obeid, and Mohammad Al Otari.

== Awards ==
Faisal Al-Fayez has received a number of Jordanian decorations throughout his career:

In 1987, he was named Officer of the Order of Order of Independence (Order of Al-Istiqlal), and was promoted to the rank of Grand Officer in 1995.

In 2000, he received the Grand Cordon of the Order of the Star of Jordan (Order of Al-Kawkab Al-Urduni).

== Personal life ==
Al-Fayez was born in Amman to Sheikh Akef Al-Fayez. He is married and has three children.

== See also ==
- List of prime ministers of Jordan
- Akef Al-Fayez
- Mithqal Al-Fayez
- Al-Fayez

Political offices
Preceded by Ali Abu al-Ragheb	Prime Minister of Jordan; 2003–2005	Succeeded by Adnan Badran
