= Ali Abu Al-Ragheb =

Jordanian politician (1946–2026)

Ali Abu al-Ragheb
- علي أبو الراغب
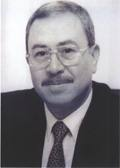

Prime Minister of Jordan
- In office 19 June 2000 – 25 October 2003
- Monarch: Abdullah II
- Preceded by: Abdelraouf Rawabdeh
- Succeeded by: Faisal al-Fayez

Personal details
- Born: 1946 Amman, Transjordan
- Died: 4 January 2026 (aged 79)
- Education: University of Tennessee
- Profession: Civil engineer

Ali Abu al-Ragheb (Arabic: علي أبو الراغب; 1946 – 4 January 2026) was a Jordanian civil engineer and politician who served as the 33rd Prime Minister of Jordan from 19 June 2000 until 25 October 2003. He resigned and was replaced by Faisal al-Fayez.

== Life and career ==
Al-Ragheb was born in Amman, Transjordan in 1946. He obtained his BSc in Civil Engineering in 1967 from the University of Tennessee in the United States.

He was partner and managing director of National Engineering and Contracting Co from 1971 to 1991. Al-Ragheb later served as Minister of Industry and Trade in 1991 and in 1995. He was also appointed Minister of Energy and Mineral Resources in 1991–1993 and was elected to the Jordanian parliament in 1993. Al-Ragheb was appointed prime minister and Minister of Defense on 19 June 2000.

Abu al-Ragheb's name was published in the Panama Papers that were released in early April 2016 by the International Consortium of Investigative Journalists (ICIJ).

Al-Ragheb died on 4 January 2026, at the age of 79. He was buried at Maqam Nabi Yusha' in As-Salt.

== Decorations ==
- Grand Cordon of the Order of the Star of Jordan Al-Kawkab Al-Urduni
- Grand Cordon of the Supreme Order of the Renaissance
- Knight Grand Cross of the Order of Merit of the Italian Republic
- Knight Grand Cross of the Order of St Michael and St George (GCMG) in Britain.

== See also ==
- List of prime ministers of Jordan

Political offices
Preceded by Abdelraouf al-Rawabdeh	Prime Minister of Jordan; 2000–2003	Succeeded by Faisal al-Fayez
