= Taher Masri =

Jordanian politician (born 1942)

His Excellency Taher al-Masri GBE
- طاهر المصري
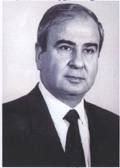
- Masri in 1960

Prime Minister of Jordan
- In office 19 June 1991 – 21 November 1991
- Monarch: King Hussein
- Preceded by: Mudar Badran
- Succeeded by: Zaid ibn Shaker

Jordanian Ambassador to France
- In office November 16, 1978 – September 21, 1988
- Preceded by: Khalid El-Salem
- Succeeded by: Awad Al-Khalidi

Personal details
- Born: Taher Nashat al-Masri; March 5, 1942 (age 84) Nablus, Mandatory Palestine
- Education: University of North Texas

Taher Nashat al-Masri (Arabic: طاهر المصري; born March 5, 1942) is a Jordanian politician who served as the 28th Prime Minister of Jordan from 19 June 1991 to 21 November 1991. He opposed the invasion of Iraq but reportedly wanted the Americans to stay in Iraq and keep it "out of the hands of the fundamentalists".

== Early life ==
Taher al-Masri was born in 1942 in Nablus, Mandatory Palestine. His father, Nashat al-Masri, was a prominent figure in Nablus, while his mother was Lebanese. He attended al-Najah National School in Nablus before moving to the United States, where he graduated from the University of Texas in 1965 with a bachelor’s degree in business administration. He subsequently began his career at the Central Bank of Jordan.

He was the Speaker of the House of Representatives of Jordan from 1993 to 1995.

He served on the Council on Foreign Relations since 2002 and is the league's commissioner for civil society. While Prime Minister, he pressed for changes to the election law.

He served as the President of the Senate of Jordan from 17 December 2009 to 24 October 2013.

== Honors ==
- Grand Cordon of the Order of the Rising Sun (2020)
- Order of the British Empire (1988) - Honorary

== See also ==
- List of prime ministers of Jordan

Political offices
Preceded by Mudar Badran	Prime Minister of Jordan; 1991–1991	Succeeded by Zaid ibn Shaker
