= Senate (Jordan) =

Upper house of the Parliament of Jordan

Senate of Jordan مجلس الأعيان Majlis Al-Aayan
- 20th Parliament

Type
- Type: Upper house of the Parliament of Jordan
- Term limits: 4 years

History
- Founded: January 1, 1952

Leadership
- President of the Senate: Faisal Al-Fayez, Independent since 7 November 2016

Structure
- Seats: 69
- Political groups: Independent (69)

Elections
- Voting system: Appointed by the King

Meeting place
- Al-Abdali, Amman

Website
- www.senate.jo/en

The Senate of Jordan is the upper house of the Jordanian Parliament which, along with the House of Representatives forms the legislature of Jordan. The Senate consists of 69 members all of whom are chosen by the king of Jordan by royal decree, but must follow the terms of Constitution of Jordan.

The presiding officer is the President of the Senate, who serves a two-year term, which can be renewed. Regular members of the Senate serve four-year terms, which can also be renewed. Meetings of the Senate are valid only if everyone is present at the meeting. Decisions are determined by the number of votes, not including the President; but if the votes are tied, the President may vote.
