= Omar Razzaz's cabinet =

Government of Jordan from 2018 to 2020

Cabinet of Omar Razzaz
- Cabinet of Jordan

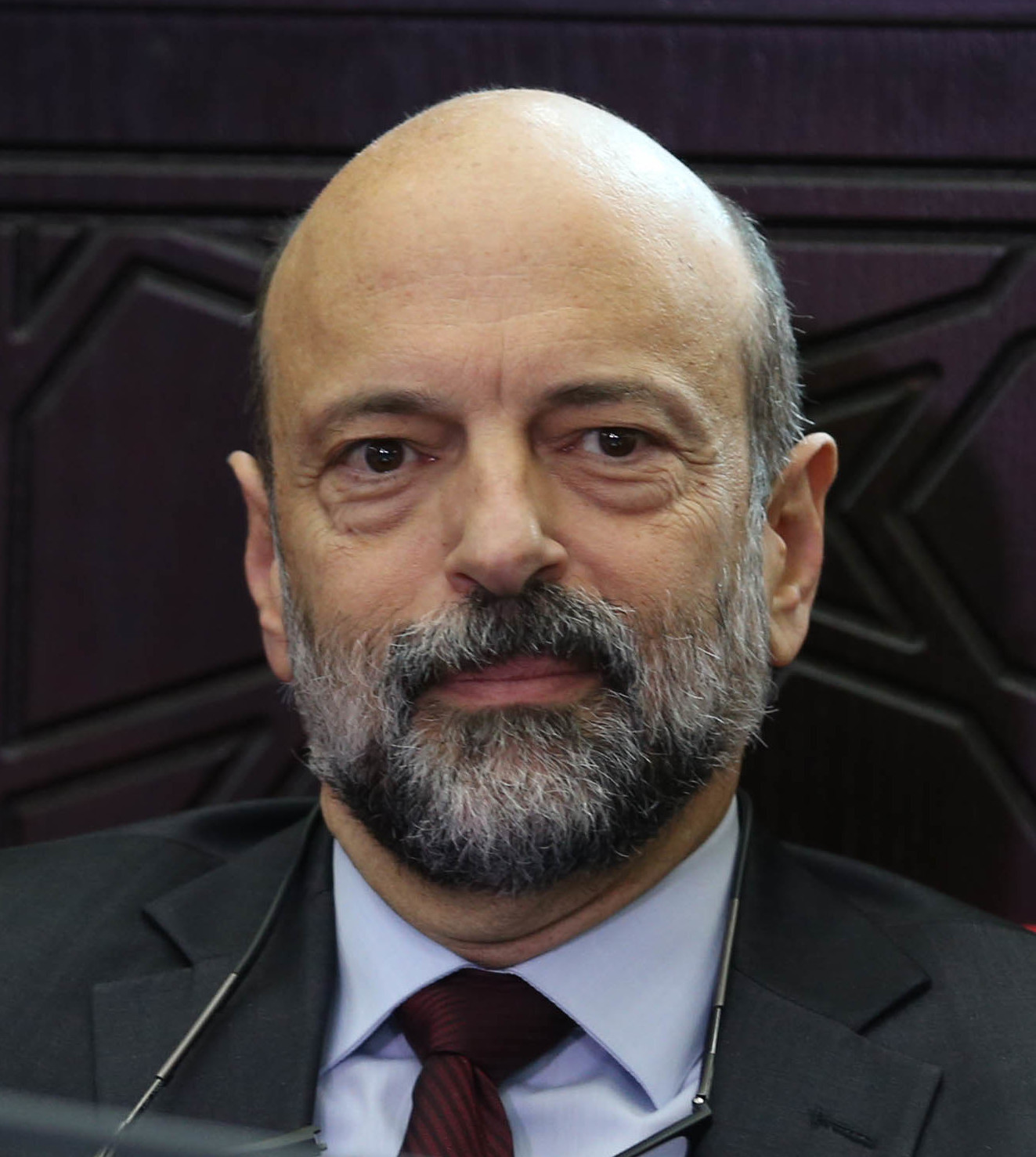
- Date formed: 14 June 2018
- Date dissolved: 12 October 2020

People and organisations
- Monarch: Abdullah II
- Prime Minister: Omar Razzaz
- Deputy Prime Minister: Rajai Muasher
- Member parties: Independent

History
- Legislature term: 18th Parliament
- Predecessor: Mulki Cabinet
- Successor: Al-Khasawneh Cabinet

This article lists the members of prime minister Omar Razzaz's cabinet. Razzaz assumed office on 4 June 2018. He was sworn in along with his cabinet on 14 June 2018.

Omar Razzaz's cabinet of ministers is composed of 28 ministers. The cabinet was formed throughout the first half of June 2018 following the resignation of the previous prime minister Hani Mulki, and officially sworn in on 14 June following a royal decree. Mulki's resignation was a result of widespread protests, which started on 30 May and were ignited by the proposed income tax bill. The new government has declared that the bill will be withdrawn from Parliament for further discussion.

Razzaz's cabinet was met with criticism due to the fact that 16 of 28 ministers remain unchanged from the preceding cabinet. Nevertheless, the cabinet holds 7 women, which is the largest representation of women that the country has seen.

On 20 June 2018, another royal decree was issued ordering the Jordanian Parliament to reconvene on 9 July for a special session so the new government can present its policy statement, which is required before a House vote of confidence can take place. On 9 July, the policy statement was delivered before the lower house of parliament. The Razzaz government became official after it secured the required vote of confidence in the lower house on 19 July. On 10 October, Razzaz reshuffled his cabinet, merged a few ministries, and created one new ministry. Eight ministers were approved by royal decree on 11 October.

== Cabinet Reshuffles ==
=== First cabinet: 20 June 2018 – 10 October 2018 ===
Razzaz's first cabinet members were appointed in June 2018. 16 out of 28 ministers remained unchanged from Hani Mulki's government.

Portrait	Name	Role	Preceded by	Comments
	Omar Razzaz	Prime Minister, and Minister of Defence	Hani Mulki	
	Rajai Muasher	Deputy Prime Minister, and Minister of State	Jamal Sarayrah	
	Ayman Safadi	Minister of Foreign and Expatriate Affairs	Unchanged	
	Adel Tweisi	Minister of Higher Education and Scientific Research	Unchanged	
	Hala Lattouf	Minister of Social Development	Unchanged	
	Musa Maaytah	Minister of Political and Parliamentary Affairs	Unchanged	
	Samir Murad	Minister of Labour	Unchanged	
	Mahmoud Sheyyab	Minister of Health	Unchanged	
	Yahya Kisbi	Minister of Public Works and Housing	Sami Halasa	
	Nayef Al-Fayez	Minister of the Environment	Unchanged	
	Walid Masri	Minister of Transportation, and Minister of Municipal Affairs	Unchanged	
	Majd Shweikeh	Minister of Public Sector Development	Unchanged	Was also minister of ICT under Hani Mulki's government
	Lina Annab	Minister of Tourism and Antiquities	Unchanged	
	Khaled Musa Al Henefat	Minister of Agriculture	Unchanged	
	Awad Abu Jarad	Minister of Justice	Unchanged	
	Muhannad Shehadeh	Minister of State for Investment Affairs	Unchanged	
	Samir Mubaidin	Minister of Interior	Unchanged	
	Abdul Nasser Abul Bassal	Minister of Awqaf and Islamic Affairs	Unchanged	
	Ezzedin Kanakrieh	Minister of Finance	Omar Malhas	
	Munir Oweiss	Minister of Water and Irrigation	Ali Ghazzawi	
	Azmi Mahafzeh	Minister of Education	Omar Razzaz	
	Makram Mustafa Queisi	Minister of Youth	Bashir Rawashdeh	
	Mubarak Abu Yamin	Minister of State for Legal Affairs	Ahmad Oweidi	
	Tareq Hammouri	Minister of Industry, Trade and Supply	Yarub Qudah	
	Jumana Ghunaimat	Minister of State for Media Affairs and Government Spokesperson	Mohammad Momani	
	Hala Zawati	Minister of Energy and Mineral Resources	Saleh Kharabseh	
	Mary Kawar	Minister of Planning and International Cooperation	Imad Fakhoury	
	Saif Nsour	Minister of Culture	Nabih Shuqum	
	Mothanna Gharaibeh	Minister of Information and Communications Technology	Majd Shweikeh	

==== Criticism ====
Razzaz has received criticism from the public for having kept more than half of the ministers from the previous cabinet, and for not having included younger people.

=== First reshuffle: 10 October 2018 – 1 November 2018 ===
On Wednesday 10 October 2018, most ministers submitted their resignations as part of Razzaz's plan to reshuffle ministers, merge a few ministries, and create a new ministry. On Thursday 11 October 2018, a royal decree was issued approving the cabinet reshuffle.

Name	Role	Comments
Omar Razzaz	Prime Minister, and Minister of Defense	
Rajai Muasher	Deputy Prime Minister and Minister of State for Prime Ministry Affairs	
Majd Shweikeh	Minister of State for Administrative and Institutional Development	New ministry
Muhannad Shehadeh	Minister of State for Investment Affairs	
Mubarak Abu Yamin	Minister of State for Legal Affairs	
Jumana Ghunaimat	Minister of State for Media Affairs and Government Spokesperson	
Abdulnasser Abu El-Bassal	Ministry of Awqaf Islamic Affairs and Holy Places	
Mohammad Abu Rumman	Minister of Culture and Youth	Merged, previous: Basma Nsour (Culture), Makram Mustafa Queisi (Youth)
Azmi Mahafzeh	Minister of Education, Higher Education, and Scientific Research	Merged, previous: Adel Tweisi (Higher Education and Scientific Research)
Hala Zawati	Minister of Energy and Mineral Resources	
Ibrahim Shahahdeh	Minister of Environment and Agriculture	Merged, previous: Nayef Al-Fayez (Environment), Khaled Hneifat (Agriculture)
Ezzedin Kanakrieh	Minister of Finance	
Ayman Safadi	Minister of Foreign and Expatriate Affairs	
Ghazi Zaben	Minister of Health	Previous: Mahmoud Sheyyab
Tareq Hammouri	Minister of Industry, Trade and Supply	
Mothanna Gharaibeh	Minister of Information and Communications Technology	
Samir Mubaidin	Minister of Interior	
Bassam Talhouni	Minister of Justice	Previous: Awad Abu Jarad
Samir Murad	Minister of Labour	
Mary Kawar	Minister of Planning and International Cooperation	
Musa Maaytah	Minister of Political and Parliamentary Affairs	
Falah Amoush	Minister of Public Works and Housing	Previous: Yahya Kisbi
Basma Isshaqat	Minister of Social Development	Previous: Hala Lattouf
Lina Annab	Minister of Tourism and Antiquities	
Walid Masri	Minister of Transportation, and Minister of Municipal Affairs	
Raed Abu Soud	Minister of Water and Irrigation	Previous: Munir Oweiss

==== Dead Sea Flash Floods ====
As a result of the catastrophe which took place in the Dead Sea due to flash rains and claimed the lives of 21 people of which 18 schoolchildren, two ministers submitted their resignations on 1 November 2018: Lina Annab – Minister of Tourism and Antiquities, and Azmi Mahafzeh – Minister of Education, Higher Education, and Scientific Research. On 22 January 2019, their replacements were announced among a minor cabinet reshuffle. Walid Maani was appointed as Minister of Education and Minister of Higher Education, Walid Masri as Minister of Municipal Affairs, Majd Shweikeh as Minister of Tourism and Antiquities and Anmar Khasawneh as Minister of Transport.

=== Second reshuffle: November 2019 ===
This Cabinet reshuffle in Razzaz’s government is the fourth in one year after similar reshuffles took place in May and January 2019 and in October 2018. Nine new ministers were sworn in.

A Royal Decree has also been issued accepting the resignation of the following, as of 7 November 2019: Rajai Muasher as deputy prime minister and minister of state, Abdul Nasser Abul Basal as minister of Awqaf and Islamic affairs, Ezzeddine Kanakrieh as minister of finance and Jumana Ghunaimat as minister of state for media affairs, Ibrahim Shahahdeh as minister of agriculture and minister of environment, Anmar Khasawneh as minister of transport, Mohammad Abu Rumman as minister of culture and minister of youth and Mohamad Al-Ississ as minister of planning and international cooperation and minister of state for economic affairs.

Name	Role	Comments
Omar Razzaz	Prime Minister, and Minister of Defense	
Ayman Safadi	Minister of Foreign and Expatriate Affairs	
Musa Maaytah	Minister of Political and Parliamentary Affairs	
Nidal Bataineh	Minister of Labour	
Walid Masri	Minister of Local Administration	
Yasera Ghosheh	Minister of State for Institutional Performance Development	
Sami Daoud	Minister of State for Prime Ministry Affairs	
Wissam Rabadi	Minister of Planning and International Cooperation	Previous: Mohamad Al-Ississ
Salameh Hammad	Minister of Interior	
Mohammad Khalaileh	Minister of Awqaf and Islamic Affairs	Previous: Abdul Nasser Abul Bassal
Mohamad Al-Ississ	Minister of Finance	Previous: Ezzedin Kanakriyah
Mubarak Abu Yamin	Minister of State for Legal Affairs	
Tareq Hammouri	Minister of Industry, Trade and Supply	
Amjad Adaileh	Minister of State for Media Affairs	Previous: Jumana Ghunaimat
Hala Zawati	Minister of Energy and Mineral Resources	
Majd Shweikeh	Minister of State for Administrative and Institutional Development	
Mothanna Gharaibeh	Minister of Digital Economy and Entrepreneurship	
Raed Abu Soud	Minister of Water and Irrigation	
Bassam Talhouni	Minister of Justice	
Majd Shweikeh	Minister of Tourism and Antiquities	
Falah Amoush	Minister of Public Works and Housing	
Basma Isshaqat	Minister of Social Development	
Saad Jaber	Minister of Health	
Ibrahim Shahahdeh	Minister of Agriculture	Split, previous: Ibrahim Shahahdeh (Environment and Agriculture)
Saleh Kharabsheh	Minister of Environment	Split, previous: Ibrahim Shahahdeh (Environment and Agriculture)
Basim Tweissi	Minister of Culture	Split, previous: Mohammad Abu Rumman (Culture and Youth)
Fares Braizat	Minister of Youth	Split, previous: Mohammad Abu Rumman (Culture and Youth)
Muhyiddine Touq	Minister of Higher Education and Scientific Research	Split, previous: Walid Maani (Education and Higher Education)
Tayseer Nueimi	Minister of Education	Split, previous: Walid Maani (Education and Higher Education)
Khalid Saif	Minister of Transport	Previous: Anmar Khasawneh

== See also ==
- 2018 Jordanian protests
- Omar Razzaz
- Hani Mulki's cabinet

Preceded by Hani Al-Mulki's second cabinet	Cabinet of Jordan; June 2018–2020	Succeeded by Bisher Al-Khasawneh's Cabinet
