= Hani Mulki's cabinet =

Government of Jordan from 2018 to 2020

Cabinet of Hani Mulki
- Cabinet of Jordan
- Date formed: 1 June 2016
- Date dissolved: 14 June 2018

People and organisations
- Monarch: Abdullah II
- Prime Minister: Hani Mulki
- Deputy Prime Ministers: Mohammad Thneibat; Nasser Judeh; Jawad Anani
- Member parties: Independent

History
- Election: 2016 general election
- Legislature terms: 17th Parliament; 18th Parliament
- Predecessor: Second Ensour Cabinet
- Successor: Razzaz Cabinet

The Prime Minister of Jordan, Hani Al-Mulki, was tasked with forming a cabinet on 29 May 2016. The new cabinet was sworn in by King Abdullah II on 1 June 2016. After the September 2016 general election, Mulki formed a new cabinet. The Cabinet consisted of 28 members, three of them also serving as Deputy Prime Ministers. 11 Ministers returned from the latest formation of the previous cabinet of Abdullah Ensour, while 9 others had served in earlier cabinets. 8 Ministers had no previous experience in cabinet. Four women obtained a position as Minister. Three university presidents were appointed to Mulki's cabinet: Rida Khawaldeh, Wajih Owais and Mahmoud Sheyyab. The cabinet reformed the Ministry of Youth, which had been abandoned in 2012.

== Policies ==
The cabinet was formed to prepare the country for the upcoming general elections. Shortly after being sworn in the cabinet announced to form task forces headed by the Deputy Prime Ministers to address issues put forward in the Letter of Designation by King Abdullah II. On 5 June 2016, Al-Mulki announced to present action plans for all 19 points mentioned in the Letter of Designation, broadly falling in the categories of political, economic and administrative issues.

Several days after taking office Mulki announced that members of the cabinet would personally visit service institutions, with the goal of improving services.

Mohamed Al-Dameeh, a commenter of the newspaper Asharq Al-Awsat, expected the Al-Mulki cabinet to prioritize economic affairs.

== First Cabinet ==
The cabinet that was sworn in consisted of:

- Prime Minister and Minister of Defence: Hani Al-Mulki
- Deputy Prime Minister for Services and Minister of Education: Mohammad Thneibat
- Deputy Prime Minister and Minister of Foreign Affairs and Expatriates: Nasser Judeh
- Deputy Prime Minister for Economic Affairs and Minister of Industry and Trade: Jawad Anani
- Minister of Agriculture: Rida Khawaldeh
- Minister of Awqaf and Islamic Affairs: Wael Arabiyat
- Minister of Culture: Adel Tweisi
- Minister of Energy and Mineral Resources: Ibrahim Saif
- Minister of Environment: Yaseen Khayyat
- Minister of Finance: Omar Malhas
- Minister of Health: Mahmoud Sheyyab
- Ministry of Higher Education and Scientific Research: Wajih Owais
- Minister of Information and Communications Technology: Majd Shweikeh
- Minister of Interior: Salameh Hammad
- Minister of Justice: Bassam Talhouni
- Minister of Labour: Ali Ghezawi
- Minister of Municipal Affairs: Walid Masri
- Minister of Planning and International Cooperation: Imad Fakhoury
- Minister of Political and Parliamentary Affairs and Minister of State: Musa Maaytah
- Minister of Public Sector Development: Yasera Ghosheh
- Minister of Public Works and Housing: Sami Halaseh
- Minister of Social Development: Khawla Armouti
- Minister of State: Khaled Hneifat
- Minister of State for Media Affairs: Mohammad Momani
- Minister of State for Prime Ministry Affairs: Fawaz Irshaidat
- Minister of Tourism and Antiquities: Lina Annab
- Minister of Transport: Yahya Kisbi
- Minister of Water and Irrigation: Hazem Nasser
- Minister of Youth: Rami Wreikat

== Second cabinet ==
King Abdullah II of Jordan tasked the prime minister Hani Al-Mulki to reform the cabinet after the 2016 Jordanian general election on 20 September 2016. The new cabinet consisted of 29 ministers, among which were two women. The new cabinet was sworn in by King Abdullah II on 28 September 2016. the three deputies kept their positions: Nasser Judeh: Deputy Prime Minister in addition to Minister of Foreign Affairs and Expatriates, Mohammad Thneibat: Deputy Prime Minister for Services and Minister of Education, and Jawad Anani: Deputy Prime Minister for Economic Affairs but he was assigned as a Minister of Investments instead of the Industry, Trade and Supply. On 15 January 2017 the cabinet saw a reshuffle, in which seven ministers left and five ministers joined.

- Hani Al-Mulki: Prime Minister and Minister of Defense
- Jawad Anani: Deputy Prime Minister for Economic Affairs and Minister of Investments
- Mohammad Thneibat: Deputy Prime Minister for Services and Minister of Education
- Nasser Judeh: Deputy Prime Minister and Minister of Foreign Affairs and Expatriates
- Salameh Hammad: Minister of Interior.
- Hazem Nasser: Minister of Water and Irrigation:
- Adel Tweisi: Minister of Culture
- Musa Maaytah: Minister of Political and Parliamentary Affairs and Minister of State
- Imad Fakhoury: Minister of Planning and International Cooperation
- Ali Ghezawi: Minister of Labor.
- Mahmoud Sheyyab: Minister of Health
- Wajih Owais: Minister of Higher Education and Scientific Research
- Yahya Kisbi: Minister of Transport
- Yaseen Khayyat: Minister of Environment
- Walid Masri: Minister of Municipal Affairs
- Ibrahim Saif: Minister of Energy and Mineral Resources
- Mohammad Momani: Minister of State for Media Affairs
- Sami Halaseh: Minister of Public Works and Housing
- Awad Al-Bakheet: Minister of Justice
- Majd Shweikeh: Minister of Information and Communications Technology
- Omar Malhas: Minister of Finance
- Rida Khawaldeh: Minister of Agriculture
- Rami Wreikat: Minister of Youth
- Fawaz Irshaidat: Minister of State for Prime Ministry Affairs
- Wael Arabiyat: Minister of Awqaf and Islamic Affairs
- Yasera Ghosheh: Minister of Public Sector Development
- Lina Annab: Minister of Tourism and Antiquities
- Khawla Armouti: Minister of Social Development:
- Khaled Hneifat: Minister of State

Preceded by Second cabinet of Ensour	Cabinet of Jordan; June 2016 – September 2016	Succeeded by Second cabinet of Al-Mulki
