= List of current senators of Jordan =

The Jordanian House of Senate currently consists of 65 members. This list includes all current senators serving in the 27th House of Senate of Jordan.

== Leadership ==
=== Presiding officers ===
Office	Party	Officer
President of the Senate	Independent	Faisal Akef Al-Fayez
First Vice President	Independent	Samir Zaid Al-Rifai
Second Vice President	Independent	Rajai Muasher
Assisting President	Independent	Mufleh Al-Rahimi
Assisting President	Independent	Alia Boran

Parliament of Jordan مجلس الأعيان Majlis Al-Aayan
- 20th Parliament

Type
- Type: Upper house of the Parliament of Jordan
- Term limits: 4 years

History
- Founded: January 1, 1952

Leadership
- President of the Senate: Faisal Al-Fayez, Independent since 7 November 2016

Structure
- Seats: 65
- Political groups: Independent (65)

Elections
- Voting system: Appointed by the King
- Last election: 10 September 2024
- Next election: 2028 or earlier

Meeting place
- Al-Abdali, Amman

Website
- www.senate.jo/en

== List of members ==
All members of the House of Senate are personally appointed by King Abdullah II. The number of Senate members, including the Speaker, should not exceed half the House of Representatives members.

Member	Party	Date sworn in
Faisal Al-Fayez	Independent	
Samir Al-Rifai	Independent	
Abdullah Ensour	Independent	
Hani Al-Mulqi	Independent	
Rajai Muasher	Independent	
Zeyad Friez	Independent	
Jamal Al-Sarayrah	Independent	
Jamal Al-Khreishah	Independent	
Abdullah Al-Khatib	Independent	
Mifleh Al-Rahimi	Independent	
Nasser Al-Lawzi	Independent	
Nayef Al Qadi	Independent	
Sami Joudeh	Independent	
Muhammad Al-Wahsh	Independent	
Alia Bouran	Independent	
Ahmad Hindawi	Independent	
Sharari Shakanbe	Independent	
Akef Al-Zoubi	Independent	
Rabiha Al-Dabbas	Independent	
Ahmad Tubaishat	Independent	
Mazen Al Saket	Independent	
Wujaieh Owais	Independent	
Yassin Al Husban	Independent	
Wajeeh Azayza	Independent	
Umayya Toukan	Independent	
Ibrahim Al-Jazi	Independent	
Bassam Hadadeen	Independent	
Nidal Qutameen	Independent	
Hussein Al-Majali	Independent	
Muhammad Al Momani	Independent	
Malik Al Kabariti	Independent	
Ahmad Al Abadi	Independent	
Muhammad Al Malkawi	Independent	
Muhammad Al Raqqad	Independent	
Mustafa Al Brari	Independent	
Mustafa Hamarneh	Independent	
Yousef Shraideh	Independent	
Muhammad Al Shawabkeh	Independent	
Ra'dah Al Qutob	Independent	
Hayfa' Al Najjar	Independent	
Mahmoud Abu Juma	Independent	
Ziyad Al Qura'an	Independent	
Issa Murad	Independent	
Sakher Dudin	Independent	
Khaled Abu Al-Iz	Independent	
Marwan Qutaishat	Independent	
Hayel Obeidat	Independent	
Mukheimer Abu Jamous	Independent	
Talal Al Sharfat	Independent	
Samir Massarweh	Independent	
Ihsan Al Barakat	Independent	
Abed Alrahman Al Adwan	Independent	
Tawfiq Al Halalmeh	Independent	
Fadil Al Hmoud	Independent	
Mustafa Al Bazay'ah	Independent	
Kheir Al Din Hakouz	Independent	
Jamal Al Shawabkeh	Independent	
Ahmad Al Hababhah	Independent	
Majed Al Maqableh	Independent	
Ghada Bashouti	Independent	
Samir Beno	Independent	
Nayfah Al-Zaben		
Abed Al Rahman Al Baqai		
Maduallah Tarawneh		
Ikrayem Al Awadat		
Mazen Darwazah		Nov. 11, 2021
Rima Batshon		Nov. 11, 2021
Jamil Al-Nimri		Nov. 11, 2021
