= Saad Jaber =

Jordanian politician

- سعد جابر

Minister of Health of Jordan
- In office 9 May 2019 – 12 October 2020
- Monarch: Abdullah II
- Prime Minister: Omar Razzaz
- Preceded by: Ghazi Zaben
- Succeeded by: Nathir Obeidat

Personal details
- Born: 16 April 1960 (age 66) Jordan
- Education: HMACSO (Hellenic Military Academy of Combat Support Officers), Aristotle University of Thessaloniki

Saad Jaber (Arabic: سعد جابر, born 16 April 1960) is the former Minister of Health of Jordan. He was appointed in Omar Razzaz's Cabinet on 9 May 2019 succeeding Ghazi Zaben, and succeeded by Natheer Obaidat. joining the cabinet in its third reshuffle since Omar Razzaz was sworn in on 14 June 2018. Before becoming minister, he was a cardiovascular surgeon with the Jordanian Royal Medical Services. Saad Jaber rose to prominence for his handling of the COVID19 virus in Jordan.

== Career ==
Jaber trained with the Greek Military Academy of Combat Support Officers (HMACSO) and obtained his medical degree from the Aristotle University of Thessaloniki. He held several positions including the Director of Queen Alia Heart Institute and President of the Jordan Cardiac Society
