= Hala Zawati =

Jordanian politician

Minister of Energy and Mineral Resources
- In office 12 October 2020 – 11 October 2021
- Monarch: Abdullah II of Jordan
- Prime Minister: Bisher Al-Khasawneh
- Succeeded by: Saleh Ali Al-Kharabsheh

Personal details
- Education: University of Jordan (B)

Hala Zawati is a Jordanian politician. Between 12 October 2020 and 11 October 2021, she held the position of Minister of Energy and Mineral Resources in Bisher Al-Khasawneh's Cabinet led by Prime Minister Bisher Al-Khasawneh. She previously served in this position in Omar Razzaz's cabinet led by Prime Minister Omar Razzaz (from 14 June 2018 till 12 October 2020).

Previously, she served as President of the Jordan Strategy Forum. She provided numerous consultations on energy affairs for the House of Representatives, companies in Jordan and companies abroad in the programs of the US Agency for Development, the German Development Agency, the Japanese Development Agency, the European Union and the United Nations Development Program.

== Educational qualifications ==
- Bachelor's degree in Electrical Engineering from the University of Jordan in 1987
- Graduate Management Degree from Universidade de Empresa in Spain in 2007
- Certificate in Leadership and Development from Harvard, Duke and Thunderbird
- Recipient of the Eisenhower Fellowships.
- 2015 Middle East Energy Manager of the Year from the American Society of Energy Engineers

== Positions ==
- Executive Director of the Jordan Strategy Forum.
- Executive Director of Edama Association for Energy, Water and Environment
- CEO of Advanced Computer Services Company
- Energy consultant for Umniah company
- King Abdullah II Fund for Development
- Al Ahli Bank and Bank of Jordan
- Minister of Energy and Mineral Resources

== Memberships ==
- Founding member of the Edama Association for Energy, Water and Environment
- Member of the Board of Directors of the Amman Stock Exchange Company
- Member of the Board of Trustees of the Elia Naqel Foundation
- Member of the charitable society of Al Khayr wa Alata'.
- Member of the Jordanian Women's Renaissance Association.
