= Jordan–Morocco relations =

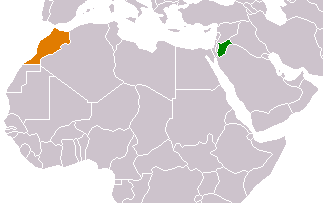

- Jordan: Morocco

Jordan and Morocco share a close relationship as both Jordan and Morocco are Arab countries. Both Jordan and Morocco share common royal relationship, Jordan is led by the Hashemites and Morocco is led by the Alaouites; and are perceived among the most liberal Kingdoms in the MENA. Jordan has an embassy in Rabat and Morocco has an embassy in Amman.

== History and modern relations ==
Modern relationship between Jordan and Morocco was established in 20th century, when Jordan gained independence from Britain and Morocco regained independence from France and Spain. For most of 20th century, both Jordan and Morocco had together faced turbulent turmoils within each nations, notably pan-Arabist movements, attempts from assassinate to overthrow the Governments in both countries and their secret ties with Israel. In spite of these hardships, however, King Hussein of Jordan and Hassan II of Morocco also overcame these turmoils at home. Two Kings were known for sharing a close and strong personal relationship, boosting alliance between two Royal families. Two Kings also died on the same year at 1999, and received mourners from global communities and homelands. Their sons, Abdullah II of Jordan and Mohammed VI of Morocco are also widely acclaimed celebrities in both countries.

In 2017, Abdullah II paid a visit to Morocco, received warm welcome from Mohammed VI. On 27 March 2019, Mohammed VI received King Abdullah II for a working visit in Casablanca.

=== Cooperations ===
Both countries share a very close cooperation that ranges from political and economic ties to security ties. The two countries were also invited to join the Gulf Cooperation Council headed by Saudi Arabia, a fellow monarchy. The two nations also have a cautious relationship with Iran. Jordan voiced support to Morocco when Rabat cut ties with Tehran following accusations of Iranian support to the Polisario in Western Sahara.

During the Qatar crisis, Jordan and Morocco tried to refrain from siding with anyone as both wanted to consolidate their roles as neutral players. The two countries also voiced their interest to solve the crisis diplomatically, which Mohammed Bin Salman, the Crown Prince of Saudi Arabia, did not approve of.

In September 2026, Morocco has recently reaffirmed its firm and unconditional support for Jordan following the Iranian attacks targeting the Hashemite Kingdom, In a message addressed to King Abdullah II, King Mohammed VI condemned these attacks and expressed Morocco’s full solidarity with Jordan, as well as its support for the measures taken by Amman to safeguard its security and stability, stressing that Jordan’s security is inseparable from that of Morocco.

== Political Relations ==
King Mohammed VI of Morocco sent a congratulatory message to King Abdullah II Ibn Al Hussein, the monarch of the Hashemite Kingdom of Jordan, and Queen Rania Al Abdullah, on the occasion of the 25th anniversary of the Royal Ascension.

== Diplomatic missions ==
=== Jordan Embassy ===
The Jordan embassy is located in Rabat. Jordan has a consulate in Laayoune.

- Ambassador Jumana Ghunaimat

=== Moroccan Embassy ===
The Moroccan embassy is located in Amman.

- Ambassador Naciri Sidi Mohamed Khalid

== See also ==
- Foreign relations of Jordan
- Foreign relations of Morocco
- Hashemites
- Alawi dynasty
