= 2019 Jordanian protests =

The 2019 Jordanian protests was mass protests and teacher strikes for a month starting after low salaries and the two-year ban if the teacher syndicate in Jordan. Thousands took to the streets in Amman on 9 September, continuing daily and the street protests aimed for better salaries and wage increases. The strike movement was launched however country-wide and nation-wide and widespread social protests against the government was erupting as well, as part of the protests. The movement consisted of Boycotts, Strikes, Rallies, Demonstrations and Marches. It is also the longest countrywide strike movement in Jordanian history. Hundreds were arrested, tortured or beaten in the street protests. After the month-long strike, the government of Omar Razzaz announced new measures and a pay-deal.

== See also ==
- 2018 Jordanian protests
