= Nayef Al-Fayez =

Jordanian politician

Nayef Himiedi Al-Fayez

Minister of Tourism and Antiquities
- In office 2012–2012
- Monarch: Abdullah II of Jordan
- Prime Minister: Fayez Tarawneh

Minister of Tourism and Antiquities and Minister of Environment
- In office 2012–2013
- Monarch: Abdullah II of Jordan
- Prime Minister: Abdullah Ensour

Minister of Environment
- In office 2018–2020
- Monarch: Abdullah II of Jordan
- Prime Minister: Omar Razzaz

Minister of Tourism and Antiquities
- In office 2020 – 22 December 2022
- Monarch: Abdullah II of Jordan
- Prime Minister: Bisher Khasawneh
- Succeeded by: Makram Mustafa Queisi

Personal details
- Education: Brigham Young University (M.A International Relations)

Nayef Himiedi Al-Fayez is a Jordanian politician. Previously he had held the position of Minister of Tourism and Antiquities in Bishr Al-Khasawneh's government from October 12, 2020 until 22 December 2022.

== Education ==
Nayef Al-Fayez holds a MA in International Relations and a Bachelor of Political Science.

== Career ==
Nayef Al-Fayez held the position of Minister of Tourism and Antiquities and Minister of Environment (2012-2013), Minister of Tourism and Antiquities (2012), Director General of the Tourism Revitalization Authority, and worked as an advisor in the Cabinet, administrative director of the Dead Sea Institute project, and Director of Prince Faisal bin Al Hussein's office.

He held the position of Minister of Environment in the government of Omar Razzaz from June 14, 2018, until his departure from the government team in the first ministerial amendment on October 11, 2018 (less than 100 days after the formation of the government), and the position of Minister of Environment in Hani Al-Mulki's second government from (February 25, 2018 - June 14, 2018).

After taking office in 2020, Nayef Al-Fayez had been working to get the city of Al-Salt to be nominated as a UNESCO World Heritage site, and to secure funding to keep the country's tourism sector afloat during the COVID-19 pandemic; the ministry since the beginning of those efforts have raised and secured 20 million JOD (28.2 millions USD).
