= Majd Shweikeh =

Jordanian businesswoman and politician

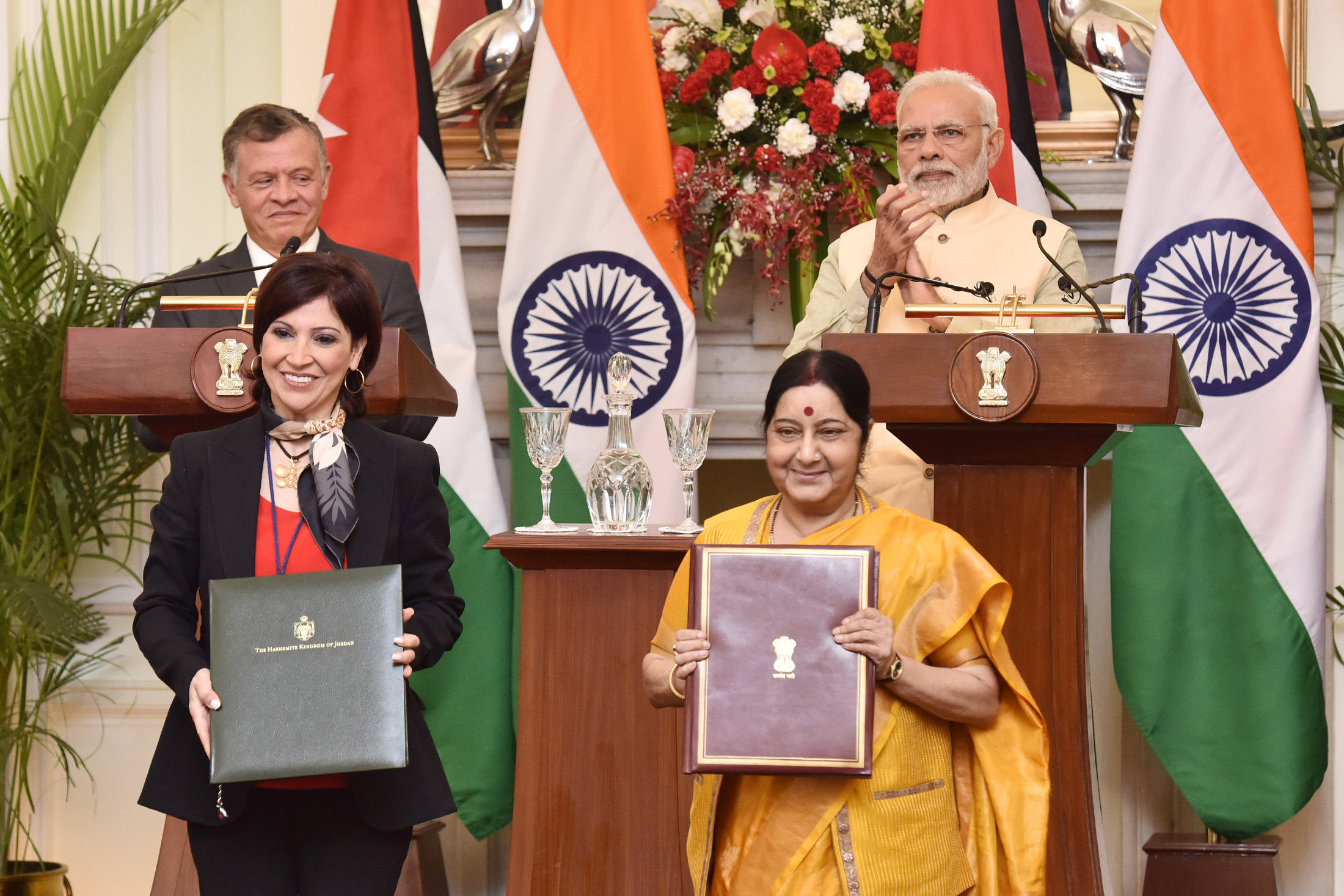

Minister of Information and Communication Technology and Minister of Public Sector Development
- In office 2 March 2015 – June 2018
- Monarch: Abdullah II
- Prime Minister: Abdullah Ensour; Hani Al-Mulki; Omar Razzaz
- Preceded by: Azzam Sleit

Personal details
- Born: 8 March 1966 (age 60)
- Education: Yarmouk University

Majd Shweikeh (Arabic: مجد شويكة; born 8 March 1966) is a Jordanian businesswoman and politician. From March 2015 to June 2018 she was Minister of information and communications technology. She previously was CEO at Orange Mobile and VTEL.

== Career ==
Shweikeh studied finance at Yarmouk University, and obtained a BsC with honors. From 2000 to January 2006 Shweikeh was CFO of Orange Mobile (Jordan), she then became CEO of Orange Mobile and Vice President of Jordan Telecom Group, which she remained until May 2010. In July 2010 she was named CEO of VTEL Holdings, and in June 2011, Group CEO of VTEL Middle East and Africa Limited.

After denouncing on Twitter the lack of women on boards of trustees of Jordanian universities, Shweikeh was asked to meet Prime Minister Abdullah Ensour in his office. After asking her about her plans on ICT he invited her to take a role in government. On 2 March 2015 Shweikeh was named minister of information and communications technology in the second cabinet of Abdullah Ensour. In Hani Al-Mulki's cabinet, which was sworn in on 1 June 2016, Shweikeh kept her position as Minister of ICT and Minister of Public Sector Development. Shweikeh remained in office after a cabinet reshuffle on 28 September 2016, becoming one of two women in the 29-member cabinet.

In March 2015 former MP Ali Dalaeen published a private photo of Shweikeh on Facebook, he criticized the wedding gown dress she was wearing and made other critical comments. Opponents of his actions then planned to sue Dalaeen, and accused him of violating norms.

In 2016 Forbes Middle East named Shweikeh number 9 on a list of most powerful Arab women in government.
