= Annab (disambiguation) =

Annab may refer to:

- Annab, a village in Syria
- the Persian word for dried jujube fruit
- a surname; notable people with the name include:
  - Lens Annab (born 1988), Belgian-Algerian football player
  - Lina Annab (born 1966), Jordanian businesswoman and politician
  - Radi Annab (1897–1993), Jordanian general

== See also ==
- Anab (disambiguation)
