= Jawad Anani =

Jordanian economist and politician

Deputy Prime Minister for Economic Affairs
- In office 1 June 2016 – 15 January 2017
- Monarch: Abdullah II of Jordan
- Prime Minister: Hani Al-Mulki

Minister of State for Investment Affairs
- In office 28 September 2016 – 15 January 2017
- Monarch: Abdullah II of Jordan
- Prime Minister: Hani Al-Mulki

Minister of Industry, Trade and Supply
- In office 1 June 2016 – 28 September 2016
- Monarch: Abdullah II of Jordan
- Prime Minister: Hani Al-Mulki
- Succeeded by: Yarub Qudah

Personal details
- Born: 28 June 1943 (age 83) Halhul, Mandatory Palestine
- Children: 5
- Education: Cairo University, Vanderbilt University, University of Georgia

Jawad Anani (born 28 June 1943) is a Jordanian economist and politician. After working for the Central Bank of Jordan in the 1960s and 1970s he held high ranking positions in the civil service. He has held several ministerial posts since 1979, including a four-year stint as Minister of Labour between 1980 and 1984. During the early 1990s he held positions as Minister of State for Cabinet Affairs and Minister of Information, and was involved in the peace-process between Jordan and Israel. During the later half of the decade he was Deputy Prime Minister for Development Affairs, Foreign Minister and Chief of the Royal Court. From June 2016 until January 2017 he was Deputy Prime Minister for Economic Affairs in the cabinets of Hani Al-Mulki.

== Early life ==
Anani was born in 1943 in Halhul. His father had various jobs, including working as an English language teacher, radio presenter, historian, writer and playwright. Jawad Anani had six brothers and two sisters. Anani went to the United States to study engineering at the University of Southern California (USC). While following his courses Robert Mundell pressured Anani to study economics. After two years Anani decided to study economics and dropped out of USC. His father advised him that if he wanted to study economics he should do so in the Arab world. Anani thus moved to Egypt and studied at Cairo University and obtained his bachelor's degree there in 1967. He subsequently moved back to the United States and obtained his master's degree at Vanderbilt University in 1970, and his PhD at the University of Georgia in 1975.

In 1967 Anani started working for the Central Bank of Jordan, he was senior researcher at the Economic Research Department. In 1977 he also started working for the Ministry of Labour as Under-Secretary, he was Director of Social Security until 1979. In his latter position he had an important role in the creation of the Social Security Corporation.

== Political career ==
Anani's political career started in 1979 when he became Minister of Supply. He served in that position until 1980 and was then appointed as Minister of Labour which he was until 1984. In that year he served as Minister of Industry, Trade and Tourism. He was president of the Royal Scientific Society between 1986 and 1989. In 1991 Anani was a Jordanian delegate to the Madrid Conference of 1991.

In 1993 he was appointed to the management board of the failing Petra Bank, where he helped cut losses. Later the same year he was appointed as Minister of State for Cabinet Affairs and Minister of Information, which he was until 1995. During that period he was co-ordinator for the peace talks with Israel. He was Deputy Prime Minister for Development Affairs between 1997 and 1998. In 1998 he was Minister for Foreign Affairs. He was Chief of the Royal Court between 1998 and 1999, he served as the last Chief under King Hussein of Jordan. He held the same position for a short while under King Abdullah II of Jordan.

In 2012 Anani was made President of the Social and Economic Council. In 2013 he stated that he saw Jordan's accession to the Gulf Co-operation Council as a "natural step" citing its "economic, financial, labor, strategic, security and cultural relations with the council". Anani has been appointed a member of the Senate several times, most recently in 2013, when he stepped down as President of the Social and Economic Council. Anani previously served in the Senate from 1993 to 2001.

On 1 June 2016 he was appointed Deputy Prime Minister for Economic Affairs and Minister of Industry, Trade and Supply in the cabinet of Hani Al-Mulki. In a cabinet reshuffle on 28 September 2016 he retained his post of Deputy Prime Minister for Economic Affairs, his ministerial post, was however, changed to that of Minister of State for Investment Affairs. He was succeeded as Minister of Industry, Trade and Supply by Yarub Qudah. On 15 January 2017 Anani resigned as Deputy Prime Minister for Economic affairs and Minister of State for Investment Affairs.

== Personal life ==
Anani frequently writes opinion pieces in The Jordan Times. He is father to five children.

== Works ==
- Peacemaking : the inside story of the 1994 Jordanian-Israeli treaty, 2006, ʻAbd al-Salām Majālī, Jawad Ahmed Anani; Munther J Haddadin. Norman: University of Oklahoma Press,
