= Samir Murad =

Jordanian businessman and politician

His Excellency Samir Murad
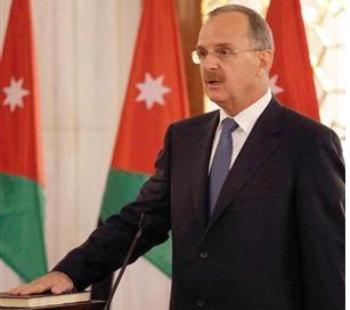
- Murad in July 2010

Jordan Minister of Labor
- Incumbent
- Assumed office February 25, 2018
- Monarch: King Abdullah II
- Prime Minister: Hani Mulki; Omar Razzaz

Personal details
- Born: November 12, 1957 (age 68) Amman, Jordan.

Samir S. Murad (Arabic: سمير سعيد مراد, Sāmīr Sāīd Murad; born 12 November 1957) is a Jordanian businessman. He is the former Minister of Labor and a former senate member. He also served as Jordan’s Minister of Labor from 2010 to 2011. He is a social entrepreneur, dedicated to youth development, education, employ-ability, responsible citizenship and public service.

== Early life ==
Murad raised in a Jordanian family, his father Said Murad was a colonel in Jordanian Army.

== Education ==
He studied in several schools in Amman and Zarka, until he moved to continue his high school and his high education in UK. He holds a degree in Management of Electrical Engineering from United Kingdom.

== Career & community and public service ==
Under his capacity as Minister of Labor he also serves as Chairman of the Social Security Corporation, Chairman of the Board of the Vocational Training Corporation, Chairman of the Employment – Technical and Vocational Education and Training Council, Chairman of the Board of the Employment – Technical and Vocational Education and Training Fund, and Chairman of the Board of the National Company for Employment and Training. Murad was also a Member of a number of other Committees, including the Executive Committee of the Development and Employment Fund and the Royal Consultative Committee for Education.

He currently serves as President of Said Murad & Sons for Trade & Investment; Chairman of Damman Energy Investment Co.; Chairman of Jordan Post; Chairman of Electricity Distribution Company; Chairman Integrated Fitness (MAGMA); Vice-Chairman of MedGulf Insurance Company; Board Member of Nuqul Automotive Company; Board Member of Jordan Social Security Investment Fund; Board Member of Jordan Economic Social Council; Secretary-General of the Jordan Scouts and Guides Association; Chairman of the Jordan Education for Employment; Board Member Jordan Strategy Forum and Economic Policy Development Forum; and recently appointed to the National Committee on Human Resource Development. He is also a Member of Palestinian Association for Children’s Encouragement of Sport (PACES); Board Member Generations for Peace. He is also a Founding Member of Jordan Chapters of the Young Presidents’ Organisation and the World Presidents Organisation and the Peace Action Network.

Murad previously served on the Boards of many profit and non profit organizations such as Capital Bank, Energy Management Services and INJAZ (an NGO dedicated for preparing young Jordanians to become productive members of their society and succeed in a global economy); EDAMA (improving productivity of environmental and energy resources in Jordan); Co-Founder of Arab Foundation for Sustainable Development (RUWWAD); Chairman of Amman Baccalaureate School Endowment Fund.

Murad is the chair of a new non-profit foundation formed by the Jordanian government. The organization will develop the area in the east bank of the Jordan River to recreate the Old City of Jerusalem in hope of attracting Christian pilgrims. This is announced to be a $100 million investment, and the initial project is targeted to end 2023. So far, nine faith organizations "granted the opportunity to build a place to welcome pilgrims to the baptism site". The foundation will raise funds for the initial phase, which is expected to cost $15 million.
