= Nathir Obeidat =

Jordanian academic administrator

Nathir Mifleh Mohammad Obeidat
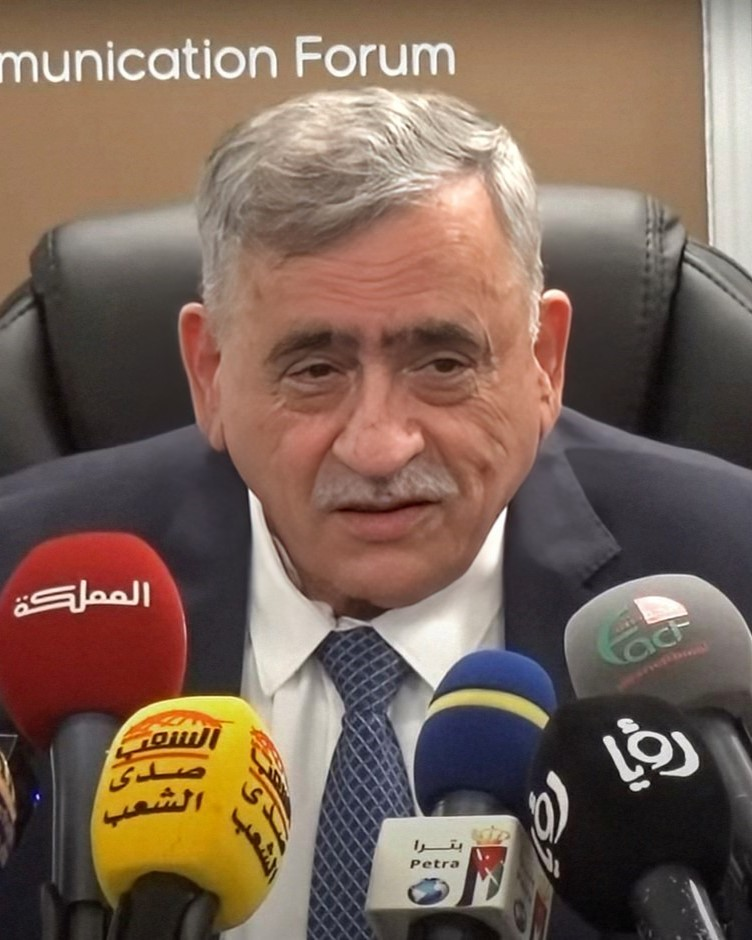
- Obeidat speaks at the Government Communication Forum on June 25, 2024.

Minister of Health
- In office 12 October 2020 – 14 March 2021
- Monarch: Abdullah II of Jordan
- Prime Minister: Bisher Al-Khasawneh
- Preceded by: Saad Jaber
- Succeeded by: Firas Al-Hawari

15 President of the University of Jordan
- Incumbent
- Assumed office August 4, 2021
- Preceded by: Abdel-Karim Al-Qudah

Personal details
- Born: December 20, 1959 (age 66)
- Education: University of Jordan (M.Sc.)

Nathir Mifleh Mohammad Obeidat (born December 20, 1959, in Hartha, Abila, Irbid) is a Jordanian physician who currently serves as the President of the University of Jordan. He held the role of Jordanian Minister of Health in Bisher Al-Khasawneh's Cabinet from October 12, 2020, until he stepped down on March 14, 2021. Prior to that, he served as Dean of the Faculty of Medicine at the University of Jordan, starting in 2016, and later took on the role of spokesperson for media communications regarding the 2019 Coronavirus outbreak in Jordan.

He tendered his resignation as Minister of Health following a request from the royal authorities, prompted by an oxygen supply failure at Salt Hospital, resulting in multiple fatalities.

== Personal life ==
Nathir is married and has three children.

== Career ==
Nathir initiated his academic journey by completing his General Secondary Education High School and obtaining his certificate in 1978. Following this, he obtained his MB.BS Degree of Medicine from the Bulgarian Medical Academy, "Ivan P. Pavlov", Plovdiv Medical University, Bulgaria, from 1979 to 1985. Nathir then began his medical career after passing the Internship Examination of the Jordanian Medical Council in 1987. He furthered his qualifications by achieving the Jordanian Board of Internal Medicine from the Jordan Medical Council in August 1994. Subsequently, he earned a Master's degree in Internal Medicine from the University of Jordan, completing a four-year training program from 1990 to 1994. His academic pursuits continued with a Diploma in Education from the University of Jordan earned in August 1996. Finally, he obtained a Fellowship in Respiratory Medicine and Sleep Medicine from the University of Sydney in Australia in December 2000, and later acquired the Jordanian Board in Respiratory Medicine from the Jordanian Medical Council in August 2002.

=== Positions ===
Since September 2007, Nathir has served as the Chairman of the Department of Internal Medicine at the Faculty of Medicine, University of Jordan, and concurrently as the Chairman of the Department of Internal Medicine at Jordan University Hospital (JUH). Additionally, he holds the positions of Director of the Division of Respiratory and Sleep Medicine and Director of the Medical Intensive Care Unit (ICU) at Jordan University Hospital.

=== Practical knowledge ===
Nathir gained professional experience that included several medical institutions:

- Since January 2001, he has served as a Consultant in Respiratory Medicine, Sleep Medicine, and Intensive Care, concurrently holding the positions of Director of the Medical Intensive Care Unit and Director of the Sleep Center at Jordan University Hospital. Additionally, he holds the rank of associate professor in the Internal Medicine department, specializing in Respiratory and Sleep Medicine.
- From July 1999 to January 2000, Nathir worked as a Senior Registrar in Sleep Medicine at Westmead Hospital, University of Sydney, Australia.
- In January 1999, he transitioned to a Registrar position in ICU at Blacktown Hospital, Sydney, Australia, where he worked until July 1999.
- Nathir's tenure at Westmead Hospital, University of Sydney, Australia, began in July 1996, where he served as a Senior Registrar in Respiratory and Sleep Medicine until January 1999.
- Between 1994 and 1996, Nathir held a Fellowship at the Department of Internal Medicine, specializing in the Respiratory Unit at Jordan University Hospital.
- In 1992, 1993, and 1995, he served as an Instructor for Introductory Courses, each spanning around two months, designed for fourth-year medical students.
- From July 1990 to June 1994, Nathir participated in a Residency program in Internal Medicine at Jordan University Hospital, Amman, Jordan.
- From July 1987 to March 1989, he served as a General Practitioner at the Jordanian Royal Medical Service, fulfilling military service obligations.
- Nathir's medical career commenced with a Rotating Internship at Jordan University Hospital, spanning from January 1986 to January 1987.
