= Yahya Kisbi =

Jordanian Minister of Public Works and Housing

Yahya Musa Kisbi

Minister of Public Works and Housing
- In office 2011 – 27 October 2022
- Monarch: Abdullah II of Jordan
- Prime Minister: Marouf Bakhit; Awn Khasawneh; Fayez Tarawneh; Abdullah Ensour; Hani Mulki; Omar Razzaz; Bisher Al-Khasawneh
- Succeeded by: Ahmad Maher Abul Samen

Personal details
- Born: Yahya Musa Kisbi; 1949 (age 76–77)
- Education: Ankara University (BS); George Washington University (MSc)

Yahya Musa Kisbi (born 1949) was the Jordanian Minister of Public Works and Housing. He had served as minister between 2011 and 2022.

== Education ==
Kisbi holds a Bachelor of Civil Engineering from the Ankara University and a Master of Construction Management from the George Washington University.
