= Mu'nis Razzaz =

- Born: 1951; As-Salt, Jordan
- Died: 2002 (aged 50–51)
- Occupation: Writer
- Parent(s): Munif Razzaz and Lamah Bseiso

Mu'nis Razzaz (1951–2002) (in Arabic: مؤنس الرزاز) was a Jordanian writer and is considered one of the most prominent modernist Arab novelists. He is primarily known for 15 award winning stories, including "State Encouragement Prize for the novel" ("جائزة الدولة التشجيعية في الرواية"), and "State Merit Award in Arts" ("جائزة الدولة التقديرية في الآداب"). His works focus on reflecting the situation of the Arabs; his wounds, fears, and pace of his life; and the repression that leads to the resignation of the mind and the pursuit of militants.

== Biography ==
=== Early life ===
Mu'nis Razzaz was born on 3 December 1951 in Al-Salt, Jordan (السلط، الأردن), to Syrians Munif Razzaz (1919–1984) (منيف الرزاز) and Lamah Bseiso (1923–2011) (لمعة بسيسو), who was a cousin of poet Moein Bseiso). He received his education at Madrasat Al mutran (مدرسة المطران) in Amman. His mother was a pioneer in social and political work and his father was involved in politics in addition to his work in medicine. In 1965, Mu'nis and his family moved to Damascus, Syria, when his father was elected as a secretary general of the National Command of the Arab Socialist Baath Party.

Razzaz attended Oxford University in the UK for a year to study English before heading to Beirut. The Lebanese Civil War interrupted his studies in philosophy at the Lebanese university, Jamiaat Beirut Al Arabiya (جامعة بيروت العربية). He continued his studies in Iraq at the University of Baghdad, where he published his first novel Al Baher Min Wara'akom (البحر من ورائكم). He then traveled to the United States to study philosophy at Georgetown University in Washington D.C. before returning a year later to Baghdad to attend his father's appointment as the assistant general secretary of the Arab Socialist Baath Party.

After spending a few years in Beirut, where he worked as a researcher for the Sho'oun Falastiniya (شؤون فلسطينية) journal, Razzaz returned to Amman in 1982, where he published several stories in the journals Al Safir (السفير) and Al Nahar (النهار), and worked at Al Ofuq (الأفق) magazine. In the mid 1980s, he received honors for fifteen of his works, as well as a number of awards including The State Encouragement Prize for Storytelling, The State Merit Award in Literature, and the Hussein Medal for Excellence. UNESCO selected his novel Al Thakira Al Moustabaha (الذاكرة المستباحة) and published three millions for Arabs.

In 1992, Razzaz was advisor to the minister of culture and chief editor of the monthly Al Afkar (الأفكار) magazine. He also wrote daily articles in the Al Ra'ii (الرأي) and Al Zaman (الزمن) magazines. He governed the administrative body of the Jordanian Writers Association from 1992 to 1994 before resigning to temporarily become the general secretary of the Arab Democratic Party.

During his final months, he began publishing chapters from his autobiography as a form of literature in Al Afkar published by the Jordanian Ministry of Culture, but died before he could complete it.

=== Close relatives ===
Mu'nis was the oldest of three siblings with a younger brother and a younger sister.

- Omar Razzaz (born in 1961) was the prime minister of Jordan from 2018 to 2020,
- Zeina Razzaz (born in 1971).

=== Death ===
Mu'nis Razzaz died at the age of 51, on 8 February 2002 at Louizmila Hospital in Amman.

== Literary works ==
Razzaz's books focus on fractures and contradictions, and contain various styles inside this single divided experience that he falls back on in accordance with his vision towards knowledge and wisdom in times of frustration and desperation. His style first developed with his own imagination and the development of the real world, and explored Arabic novels, ancient Arab legacy, and foreign culture. His style heavily utilizes sarcasm and mockery, which he considered the "best weapon to face the haunted reality – for the loser who laughs at his wounds is a winner in reality."

The diversity of constructions and their models within the same novel or between novels reflects his ability to renew, continue experimenting, and generate ideas that are distanced from stereotypes. It does not offer a reproduction of fictional or traditional narrative experiences, but rather a connection to create new models represented by a world of innovation and modernity.

Razzaz's literary works focus on freedom, like his two novels أحياء في البحر الميّت and ليلة عسل. He believed that freedom is an important human value that must be practiced in the daily life of every Arab citizen. He was one of the few Arab writers who dared to write about freedom and its violations in the Arab world. His previous experience in politics focused his interest on the role of freedom and he used his writing to raise political awareness among the readers. Razzaz also criticized the violence of Arab dictatorship regimes in his writings. In his two works, متاهة الاعراب في ناطحات السحاب and عترافات كاتم الصوت, he described the leaders as "wolves" and the citizens as "rabbits" as a critique against the regimes he considered oppressive.

Razzaz used to publish daily political articles in many Jordanian and Arab newspapers, including the Jordanian newspaper Al-Dustour in the second half of the 1980s and the Jordanian newspaper Al-Rai in the 1990s.

== Published works ==
Date of publication	Book
1973	مد اللسان الصغير في وجه العالم الكبير
1975	البحر من ورائكم
1980	النمرود : مجموعة قصص
1982	أحياء في البحر الميت
1986	متاهة الاعراب في ناطحات السراب : رواية
1986	اعترافات كاتم صوت
1986	متاهة الاعراب في ناطحات السراب : رواية
1991	(جمعة القفاري ( يوميات نكرة
1991	الذاكرة المستباحة
1991	قبعتان ورأس واحد
1994	مذكرات ديناصور : رواية
1994	الشظايا والفسيفساء
1995	فاصلة في آخر الـسطر
1997	حين تستيقظ الاحلام
1997	سلطان النوم وزرقاء اليمامة : الف رواية ورواية في حكاية: رواية
1997	عصابة الوردة الدامية
1998	الحال العربي المعاصر : حوار مع منح الصلح
2000	ليلة عسل
2003	الأعمال الكاملة
2003	الحاضر—الغائب : من كتابات مؤنس الرزاز

== Honours, awards and distinctions ==
Razzaz received several awards for assiduity and diligence in his novel works, including "State Encouragement Prize for the novel" (جائزة الدولة التشجيعية في الرواية), "State Merit Award in Arts" (جائزة الدولة التقديرية في الآداب), and the "Al Hussein Medal for Success". UNESCO chose his novel The Permissible Memory (الذاكرة المستباحة) and printed 3,000,000 copies for Arab readers. In addition, several masters and doctoral theses in literature have been written about him.

== Philosophical view ==
Razzaz was known for his negative philosophical view, and was in a constant state of depression. In one of his writings, "شظايا و فسيفساء", he talked about the misery of the Arab life, mentioning that the world was being filled up with cracks and all that was left were some sort of spirits. Writer Faisal Darraj mentioned that all Razzaz wanted to mention in his novels was the collapsing of the Arab world instead of its prosperity.
