= Salameh Hammad =

Jordanian politician

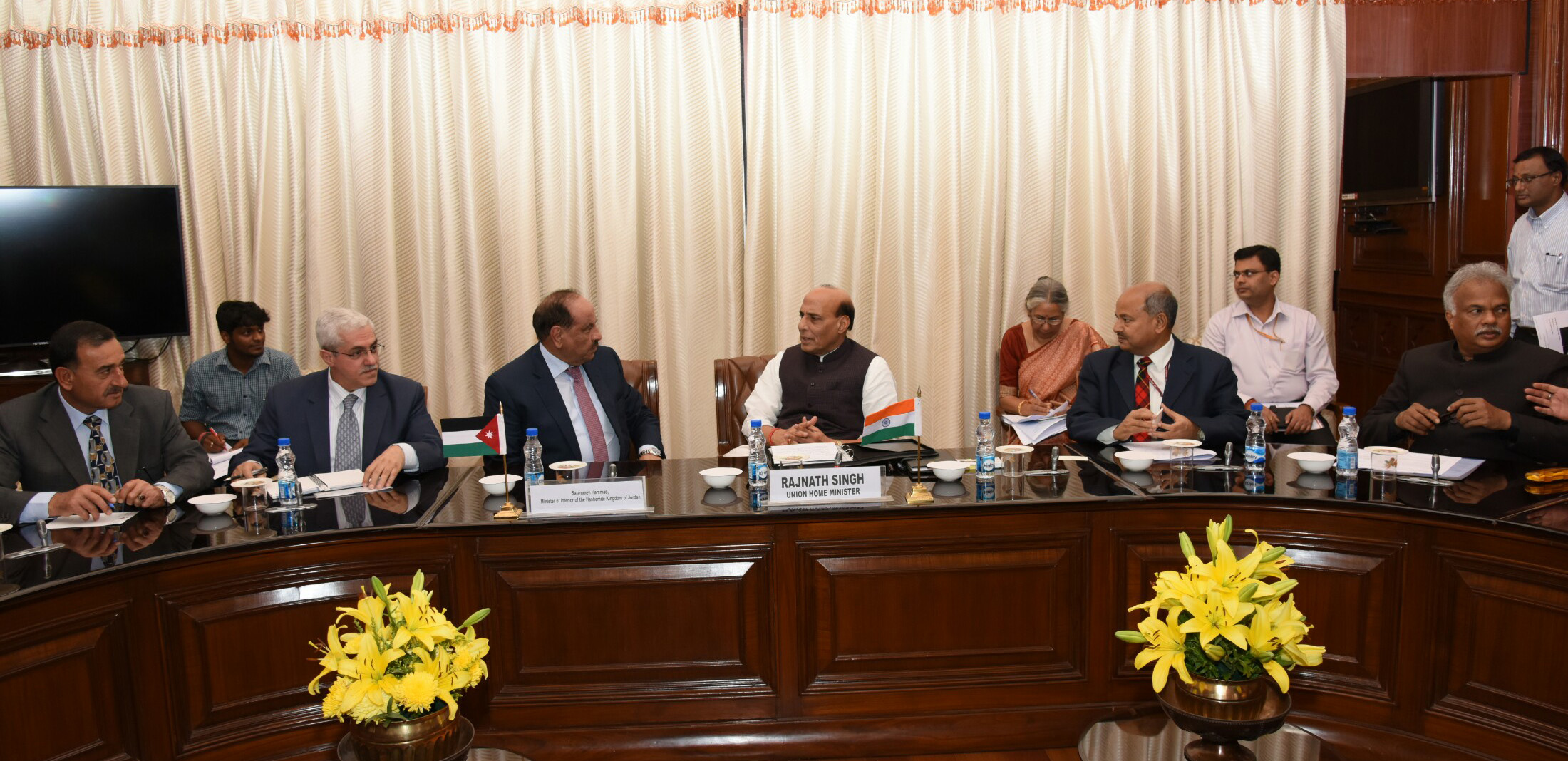

Interior Minister
- In office 9 May 2019 – 12 October 2020
- Prime Minister: Omar Razzaz
- Preceded by: Samir Mubaidin
- Succeeded by: Tawfiq Al Halalmeh

Interior Minister
- In office 2 June 2016 – 15 January 2017
- Prime Minister: Hani Al-Mulki
- Preceded by: Mazen Qadi
- Succeeded by: Ghaleb Zu'bi

Interior Minister
- In office 19 May 2015 – 19 April 2016
- Prime Minister: Abdullah Ensour
- Preceded by: Hussein Al-Majali
- Succeeded by: Mazen Qadi

Interior Minister
- In office 8 January 1995 – 2 April 1996

Interior Minister
- In office 1993–1995

Personal details
- Born: Salameh Hammad Salem Al-Suhaim; 1944 (age 81–82) Amman, Emirate of Transjordan
- Education: University of Baghdad, Sorbonne University

Salameh Hammad (born 1944) is a Jordanian politician who has served as Minister of the Interior in the government of Jordan a number of times. He held the position from 1993 to 1995, from 1995 to 1996, from 2015 to 2016, from 2016 to 2017 and lastly from May 2019 until October 2020.

== Career ==
Hammad was born in Amman in 1944. He studied law at the University of Baghdad in Iraq where he obtained a degree in 1969. He obtained a master's degree from the Sorbonne University in 1976.

He oversaw the 1989 general elections as secretary-general of the Interior Ministry. In 1990, while in the same position, he dealt with the refugee flux from Kuwait to Jordan, which was caused by the Gulf War. Hammad was Minister of the Interior from 1993 to 1995 and again from 8 January 1995 to 2 April 1996.

He was again appointed as Interior Minister on 19 May 2015 after the resignation of Hussein Al-Majali two days earlier. On 19 April 2016 he was replaced by Mazen Qadi. When Abdullah Ensour was replaced as prime minister in June 2016 by Hani Al-Mulki, Hammad returned as Interior Minister. In a cabinet reshuffle on 28 September 2016 Hammad retained his position. In another cabinet reshuffle, Hammad was replaced by Ghaleb Zu'bi on 15 January 2017.

Hammad once more returned as Minister of Interior on 9 May 2019, when he was appointed to replace Samir Mubaidin in a cabinet reshuffle by Prime Minister Omar Razzaz. This happened at the same time as a change of the chiefs of the security agencies in Jordan. With the formation of Bisher Al-Khasawneh's Cabinet he was replaced by Tawfiq Al Halalmeh on 12 October 2020.

Hammad became member of the 30th Senate of Jordan.

Hammad has been awarded Jordan's Order of Independence (second class), and the Order of the Star of Jordan (second class).
