= Rajai Muasher =

Jordanian politician

Rajai Muasher Dababneh
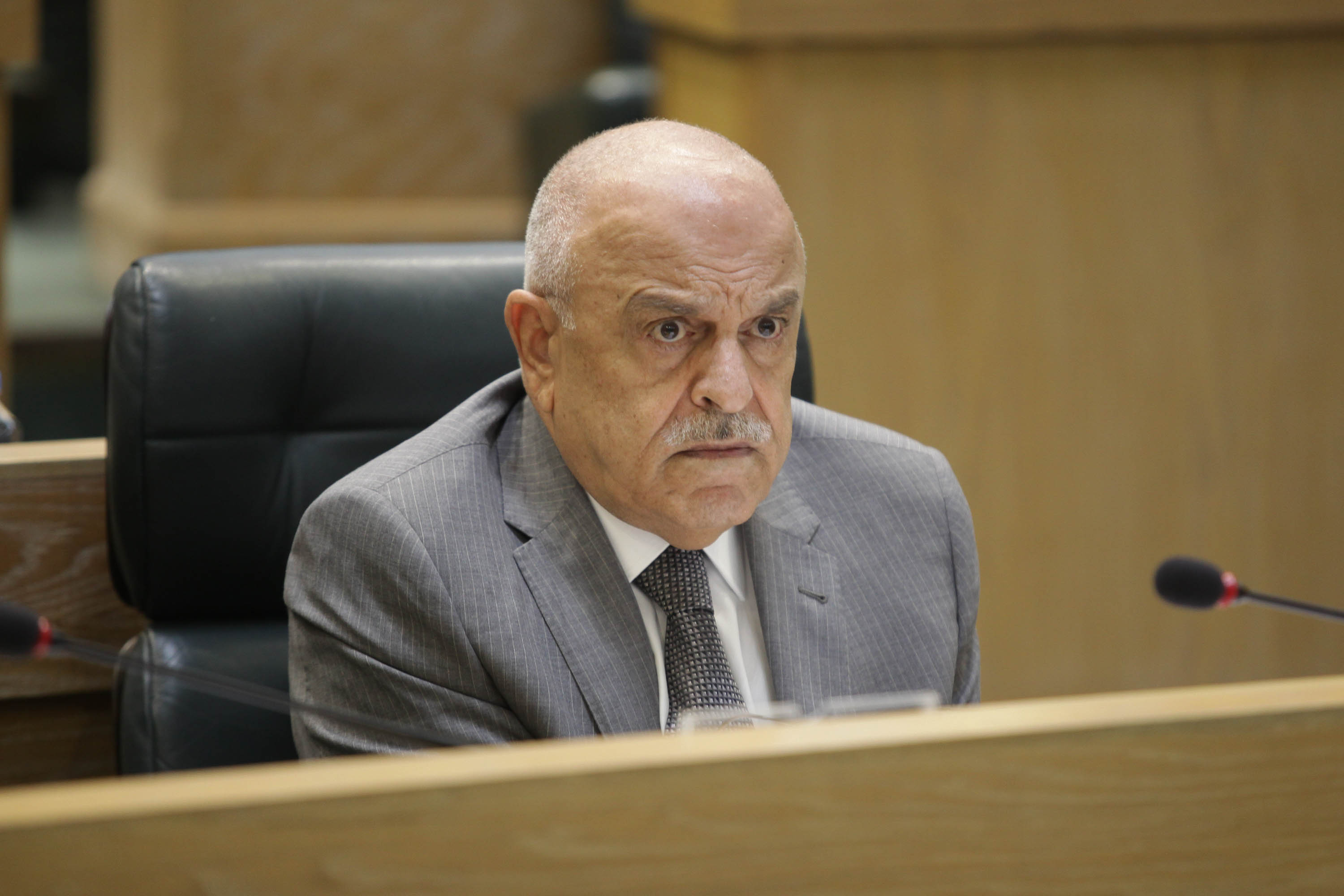

Deputy Prime Minister
- In office 14 June 2018 – 2020
- Monarch: Abdullah II
- Prime Minister: Omar Razzaz
- Preceded by: Jamal Sarayrah

Personal details
- Born: 1 January 1944 (age 82) Amman, Emirate of Transjordan (present-day Jordan)
- Party: Independent
- Education: University of Illinois
- Alma mater: University of Illinois

Rajai Muasher Dababneh (Arabic: رجائي المعشر الدبابنه ʾRaja'i Al-Mu'asher) is a Jordanian politician who served as Jordan's Deputy Prime Minister from 2018 to 2020.

Muasher previously served as Deputy Prime Minister in 2009 under Samir Rifai's government in 2009. He also served in the Senate until his appointment as Deputy Prime Minister by Omar Razzaz on 16 June 2018.

== Biography ==
Muasher was born in a Christian family in Amman in 1944. He obtained a Master of Business Administration in 1966, and a PhD in Business Administration in 1971 from the University of Illinois.

Muasher served as minister in a number of ministries in the 1970s, and became head to Jordan's Ahli Bank in the 2000s. He served as Deputy Prime Minister in 2009 under Samir Rifai's government in 2009. He also served in the Senate until his appointment as Deputy Prime Minister by Omar Razzaz on 16 June 2018.

Reuters in 2009 described him to be "a prominent businessman and vocal critic of the liberal reformists and supporter of a wider role for the state in the economy." After his designation as Deputy Prime Minister, Reuters described him as a "conservative politician and influential banker and among Jordan's wealthiest businessmen."
