= Anab (disambiguation) =

Anab was a biblical city in the mountains of Judah.

Anab or ANAB may also refer to:

- ANAB, or ANSI-ASQ National Accreditation Board, US-based non-governmental standards organization
- Anab, the NATO reporting name for the K-8 (missile) "Kaliningrad" air-to-air missile

== See also ==
- Annab (disambiguation)
