= Azzam Sleit =

Jordanian engineer and politician (born 1966)

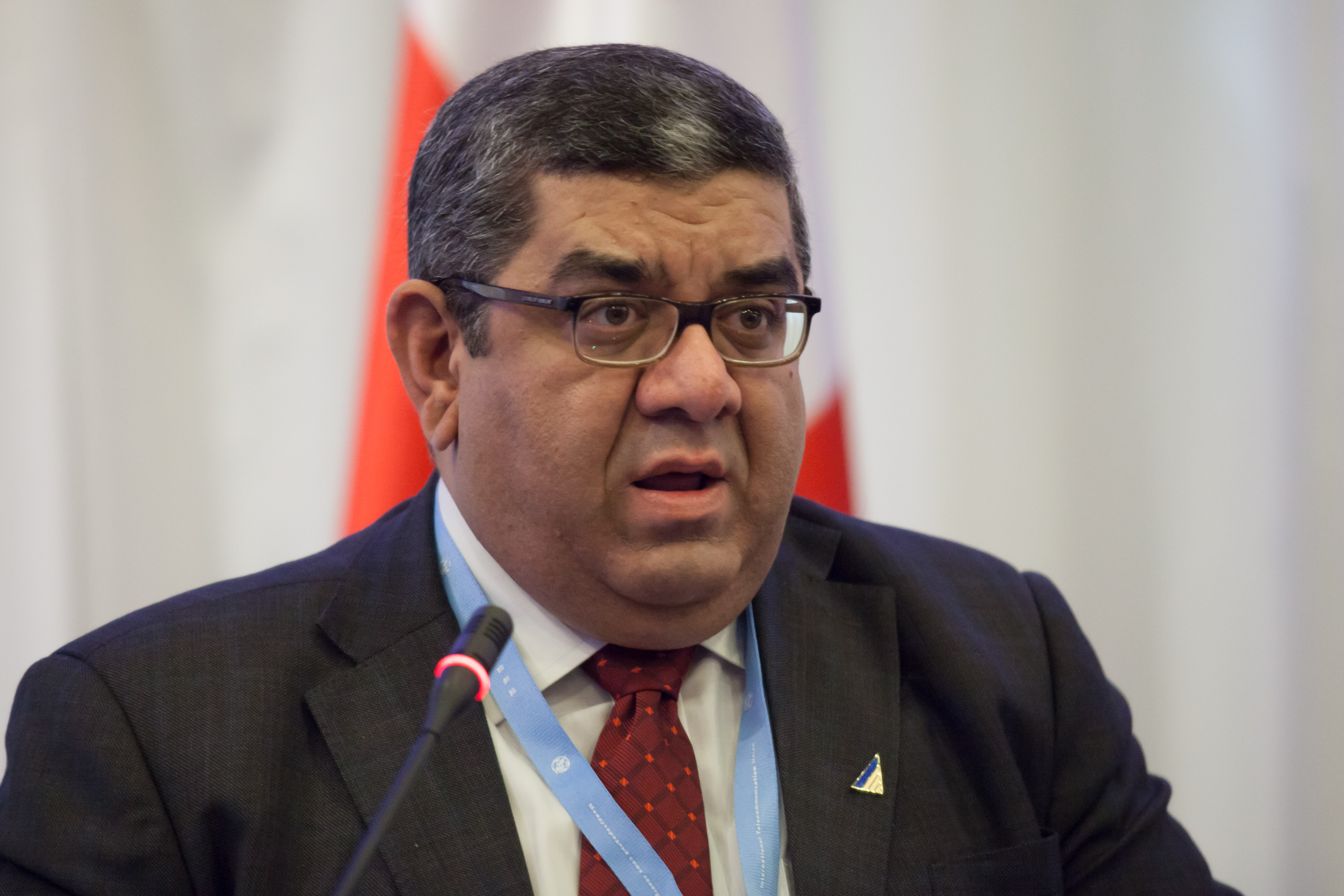

Minister of Information and Communication Technology
- In office 21 August 2013 – 2 March 2015
- Monarch: King Abdullah II
- Prime Minister: Abdullah Ensour
- Succeeded by: Majd Shweikeh

Personal details
- Born: 9 June 1966 (age 60)
- Party: Independent
- Education: King Fahd University; Wayne State University

Azzam Sleit (born 1966) is a Jordanian academic and politician. He was minister of information and communication technology of Jordan between 21 August 2013 and 2 March 2015.

== Early life and education ==
Sleit was born on 9 June 1966. He received bachelor's degree and master's degree in computer science and engineering both from King Fahd University. He also holds a PhD in computer science from Wayne State University, Michigan, which he obtained in February 1995.

== Career ==
Sleit worked as the vice president of Strategic Group and director of professional services of Triada, United States. He also assumed IT-related senior management positions in various US firms including Information Builders, MetLife, and Electronic Data Systems (EDS). He was the chief information officer (CIO) at Hamad Medical Organization which is affiliated body of Qatari Ministry of Public Health until 2005. In 2005, he joined Jordan University and worked as a professor of computer science. His main study fields are imaging databases, algorithms, health information systems and cloud computing.

From 2007 to 2009 he was also Jordan University's vice chairman and director of the Computer Center. In a cabinet reshuffle on 21 August 2013 he was appointed to the cabinet led by Prime Minister Abdullah Ensour as Minister of Information and Communications Technology. He was replaced in a cabinet reshuffle on 2 March 2015 by Majd Shweikeh.

Sleit is the dean of Information Technology College at Jordan University.
