= Amjad Adaileh =

Jordanian politician (born 1962)

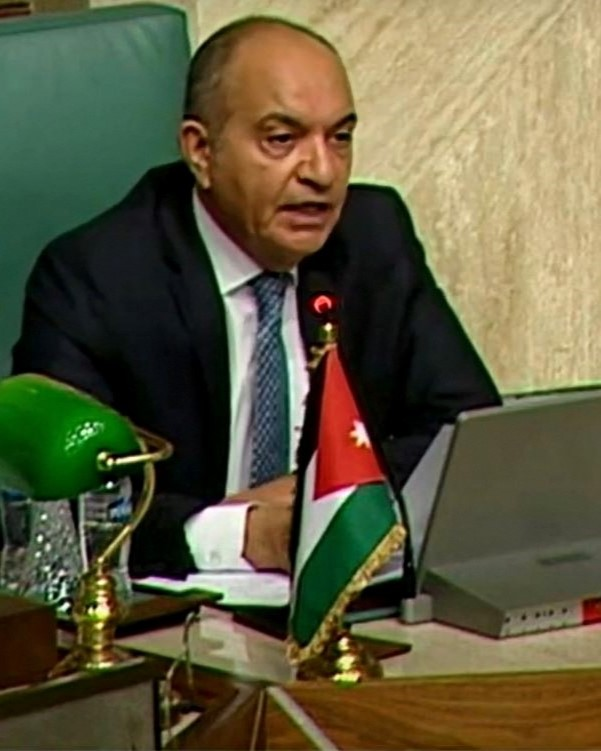
- Amjad Adaileh delivering a speech at the Arab League in Egypt on October 31, 2024.

Minister of State for Media Affairs
- In office 2019–2020
- Monarch: Abdullah II of Jordan
- Prime Minister: Omar Razzaz
- Preceded by: Jumana Ghunaimat

Personal details
- Born: 1962 (age 63–64) Kerak, Jordan

Amjad Adaileh MVO (Arabic: امجد عودة العضايلة) is a Jordanian politician specialising in news media and communications. He is the current Ambassador of the Hashemite Kingdom of Jordan to the Arab Republic of Egypt and Permanent Representative of Jordan to the League of Arab States. Born in 1962 in Kerak, southern region of Jordan.

== Education and career ==
Adaileh graduated from Yarmouk University in 1984 with a B.A. Media Editing and Production. He started his career working for the Ministry of Information in 1987. He soon moved to working for the Royal Hashemite Court's Department of Public Relations in 1992.

At the Court, Adaileh served as the director of Arabic Media (2000–2006) and the director general of Media and Communications (2006–2008). He was appointed in February 2011 as the media and communications advisor to King Abdullah II of Jordan.

On 25 September 2007 Adaileh was promoted to the rank of minister in the Royal Hashemite Court by royal decree.

In 2012, Adalieh was appointed as the ambassador of Jordan to Turkey and as an unresidenced ambassador to Macedonia and Turkmenistan. In 2017, Adaileh was appointed as the ambassador of Jordan to Russia. In 2019, Adaileh was appointed as the minister of state for media affairs.

In November 2020, Adaileh was appointed Ambassador of Jordan to Egypt.

== Family ==
Amjad Adaileh is married and has 4 children, 2 girls and 2 boys (Nadine, Ghassan, Raya and Mohammad).

== Memberships ==
- Member of the board of trustees of the Royal Jordanian Hashemite Documentation Centre (2008–present)
- Member of the board of trustees of Jadara University (2008–present)
- University of Jordan Centre for Strategic Studies board of trustees (2007–present)
- University of Jordan Medical College board (2006–2007)
- Member of Jordan First Royal Commission (October 2002)

== Decorations, awards and honors ==
- Jordanian Independence Medal of the 1st Order (Jordan, 2003) – awarded by King Abdullah II
- Jordanian Independence Medal of the 2nd Order (Jordan, 2001) – awarded by King Abdullah II
- Grand Officer of the Order of Orange-Nassau (Netherlands, 2006) – awarded by Queen Beatrix
- Knight Commander of the Royal Order of the Polar Star (Sweden, 2003) – awarded by Carl XVI Gustaf
- Commander's Cross of the Order of Merit of the Federal Republic of Germany (Germany, 2002) – awarded by Chancellor Gerhardt Schroeder
- Commander of the Order of Merit of the Republic of Italy (Italy, 2001) – awarded by President Carlo Azeglio Ciampi
- Honorary Lieutenant of the Royal Victorian Order (United Kingdom, 2001) – awarded by Queen Elizabeth II
- Commander of the Royal Norwegian Order of Merit (Norway, 2000) – awarded by King Harold V
- Order of the Sacred Treasure (Japan, 1999) – awarded by Emperor Akihito
- Commander of the Ordre national du Mérite (France, 2000) – awarded by President Jacques Chirac
- Officer's Cross of the Order of Isabella the Catholic (Spain, 1999) – awarded by King Juan Carlos
- Knight 4th Class Officer of the Order of Orange-Nassau (Netherlands, 1994) – awarded by Queen Beatrix
- Knight's Cross of the Order of Civil Merit (Spain, 1994) – awarded by King Juan Carlos
