= Rida Khawaldeh =

Jordanian academic and politician

Member of the Senate
- In office 27 September 2016 – Before December 2020

Minister of Agriculture
- In office 1 June 2016 – 28 September 2016
- Prime Minister: Hani Mulki
- Succeeded by: Khaled Hneifat

Personal details
- Born: 15 July 1962 (age 64) Mursa, Jerash, Jordan
- Education: University of Jordan, University of Illinois

Rida Shibli Khawaldeh (born 15 July 1962) is a Jordanian academic and politician. He was Minister of Agriculture in the government of Hani Mulki between 1 June 2016 and 28 September 2016, when he left the government in a cabinet reshuffle. Khawaldeh was subsequently appointed to the Senate.

== Life ==
Khawaldeh was born on 15 July 1962 in Mursa, Jerash, Jordan. Khawaldeh studied plant production at the University of Jordan and obtained a BSc and MSc there in 1984 and 1986 respectively. In 1990, he obtained his PhD from the University of Illinois. In April 2012 he became president of the University of Jordan at Aqaba. In April 2013 Khawaldeh was appointed by royal decree as president of Mutah University.

== Political career ==
Khawaldeh was named minister of agriculture in the government of Hani Mulki which was sworn in on 1 June 2016. Khawaldeh was one of three university presidents appointed in the government Mulki. On 28 September 2016 Mulki performed a cabinet reshuffle which led Khawaldeh to lose his position, he was succeeded by Khaled Hneifat.

Khawaldeh was appointed member of the Senate on 27 September 2016. In 2018, while attending a conference of the Jordan Society for Scientific Research, he called for a national conference with all actors to create and effective strategy to deal with plant and animals species extinction in Jordan. As member of the senate Khawaldeh was chair of the Jordanian-Mexican Friendship Committee and presided over a meeting with the Mexican ambassador in March 2019. By December 2020 his term in the senate had ended.

== Return to academia ==
By late 2020 Khawaldeh was president of the Jordan Society for Scientific Research.

By September 2022, Khawaldeh was the dean of the agricultary technology faculty and dean of scientific research at Al-Ahliyya Amman University.

In September 2025, Khawaldeh was serving as Hamdi Mango Center for Scientific Research.

In December 2025 he also served as executive secretary of the Association of Agricultural Research Institutions in the Near East and North Africa.
