= Khawla Armouti =

Jordanian politician

Minister of Social Development
- In office 1 June 2016 – 20 June 2018
- Monarch: Abdullah II of Jordan
- Prime Minister: Hani Mulki
- Succeeded by: Hala Lattouf

Personal details
- Education: University of Jordan (B)
- Occupation: Politician

Khawla Armouti is a Jordanian politician. She served as Minister of Social Development from 1 June 2016 until 20 June 2018.

== Early life ==
Khawla Armouti is a graduate of Islamic Scientific College in Amman, Jordan. She did her bachelor's degree in sociology at the University of Jordan. While she was a student she volunteered her time working at charities in Hayy Nazzal, Amman. She worked as the general manager of Ayadi Mudee’a, an organization for training and development based in Sahab district. She is on the board of trustees of the Jordanian Palestinian Brotherhood Society and the Haya Cultural Center. She is the honorary president of Jamasin charity and the Sahab Development Organization. She served in the International Organization for the Support of Arab Students as its vice-president.

== Career ==
Khawla Armouti was the Jordanian Minister of Social Development. She was appointed to the Minister of Social Development in the first cabinet of Prime Minister Hani Mulki and was kept in the second cabinet on 29 September 2016. On government projects she said that the Ministry of Social Development will protect productive projects that will reduce poverty and increase employment in Jordan on 26 June 2016. She all called for international assistance to Jordan to help deal with the influx of Syrian refugees. She has discussed ways of improving ties between Higher Council for the Affairs of Persons with Disabilities and Social Development Ministry, with Prince Mired the president of the council. On 20 June 2018, Hala Lattouf succeeded her as Minister of Social Development. She is a sponsor of the Jordan River Foundation.
