= Farouq Qasrawi =

Jordanian politician and diplomat (1942–2021)

Farouq Ahmad Ali Al Qasrawi

Minister of Foreign Affairs
- In office 7 April 2005 – 24 November 2005
- Succeeded by: Abdul Ilah Khatib

Personal details
- Born: 12 February 1942
- Died: 10 November 2021 (aged 79)
- Education: AUB; University of London; George Washington University
- Profession: Diplomat

Farouq Qasrawi (12 February 1942 – 10 November 2021) was a Jordanian politician and diplomat. He served as Minister of Foreign Affairs in 2005.

== Career ==
Qasrawi was director of the Jordan Diplomatic Institute and the ambassador of Jordan to Japan and Germany. He was appointed foreign minister of Jordan on 7 April 2005 when a new government was formed. His predecessor was Hani al-Mulki.

Qasrawi then worked as the personal envoy of King Abdullah II. Later, Qasrawi was appointed manager of the personal office of the king, and then a personal advisor to him. In November 2007, Qasrawi was appointed a senator.
