= Jumana Ghunaimat =

- جمانة غنيمات
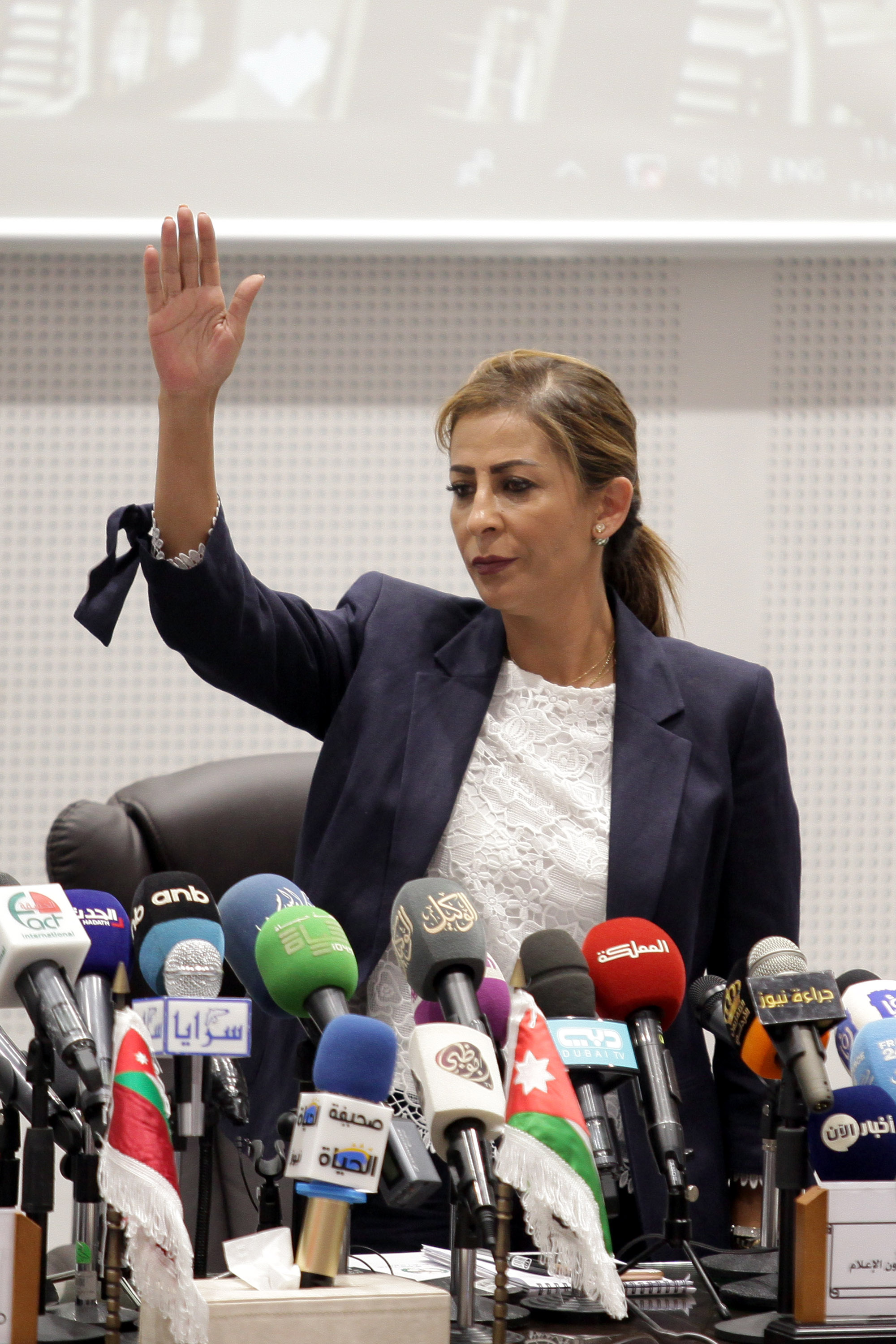

Minister of State for Media Affairs
- In office 14 June 2018 – 6 November 2019
- Monarch: Abdullah II
- Prime Minister: Omar Razzaz
- Preceded by: Mohammad Momani
- Succeeded by: Amjad Adaileh

Personal details
- Born: 4 December 1973 (age 52) Al-Salt
- Education: University of Jordan

Jumana Ghunaimat (Arabic: جمانة غنيمات; born 4 December 1973) is a Jordanian journalist and media figure, and is the former Minister of State for Media Affairs and Government Spokesperson in Prime Minister Omar Al-Razzaz's cabinet on 14 June 2018. She currently occupies the position of Jordan's ambassador to Morocco.

== Personal life ==
Ghunaimat was born and raised in Al-Salt to a family of nine boys and three girls. Her father is retired major general and former deputy Pasha Suleiman Ali Ghunaimat, and her mother Hind Abdel Fattah Ghunaimat is a retired teacher. Ghunaimat moved between Baghdad and Amman when her father was a military attaché in Iraq, and studied at the model school located in Salt, completing secondary studies there.

She holds a bachelor's degree in political science from the University of Jordan, obtained in June 1996.

Ghunaimat has two children, a daughter named Wassan and a son named Shas.

== Career ==
Ghunaimat started her career in 1996 in Al-Rai Newspaper in the advertising department, and then she took over the poverty pockets file. In 2006, she was offered a job in the Jordanian newspaper "Al-Sijel", in addition to her work in "Al-Rai", with professors Mustafa Al-Hamarneh and George Hawatmeh. Ghunaimat also supported women and poor citizens in Jordanian society.

In 2008, she made the decision to leave Al-Rai Newspaper, and then moved to Al-Ghad Newspaper at the end of 2008 as director of the economic page. She was then appointed editor-in-chief in 2012, by a decision of the publisher of Al-Ghad, the Jordanian businessman and investor Muhammad Alyan, to be the sixth editor-in-chief to occupy this position, which was launched in 2004.

She is the first woman to receive the position of editor-in-chief of an Arab newspaper. Ghunaimat wrote for a number of websites, and worked as an economic analyst for a number of local and Arab visual media, including: Al Arabiya TV, Al Jazeera, Jordan TV, and Roya TV.

She submitted several papers after leaving the ministry, especially regarding the coronavirus pandemic, where she spoke about media policies in light of the that pandemic. She continued to defend social media.

On June 14, 2018, she was appointed as Minister of State for Media Affairs in the government of Dr. Omar Razzaz, taking the constitutional oath before the Jordanian monarch at Al Husseiniya Palace in Amman. Until November 6, 2019 after Prime Minister Omar Razzaz's decision to carry out a cabinet reshuffle.

=== Awards and honors ===
- In August 2014, she conducted an exclusive Al-Ghad newspaper interview with Jordan’s King Abdullah II bin Al Hussein
- In March 2016, she was nominated by the European Union Ambassador to Jordan Andrea Matteo Fontana, to be among the "Women Pioneering in Development List", "for her dedication to empowering media and journalism", on the occasion of International Women's Day.
- On September 1, 2021, a royal decree was issued approving the cabinet’s decision to appointing her as an ambassador in the Ministry of Foreign Affairs and Immigrants, and naming her an ambassador to the kingdom of Morocco. She was awarded the Order of Independence, First Class, on the occasion of her designation as ambassador extraordinary and plenipotentiary to Morocco.

=== Memberships ===
- Member of the board of trustees of the National Centre for Human Rights (Jordan).
- Member of the International Women's Forum.
- Member of the "One Evra" organization concerned with developing print media and supporting women to take on leadership in written media.

== Controversies ==
=== Appearance before the Jordanian judiciary ===
She appeared before the judiciary in several publications and publishing cases as a result of a case filed by an unknown person, on October 11, 2014, when she was serving as editor-in-chief of Al-Ghad newspaper, she appeared before Amman's public prosecutor, Judge Rami Al-Tarawneh, against the background of a complaint submitted to the Public Prosecution by the Public Prosecutor, after she published an article Entitled “We are tired of the show...so stop it!”, related to the behavior of some members of Parliament.

The public prosecutor assigned her a charge of not investigating the truth in violation of the provisions of Article 5 of the Publication Law, a charge of lack of objectivity and balance in contravention of the provisions of period 7 / c of the Publications Law, and a charge of defaming an official body based on the provisions of Article 191 of the Penal Code. Amman Public Prosecutor, Judge Rami Al-Tarawneh, decided on Wednesday, October 29, 2014, to prevent the trial of Al-Ghad newspaper and its editor-in-chief (who was Jumana Ghunaimat).

The judge based his decision on the fact that the article published in the newspaper came within the permissible criticism that aims to correct and improve performance and is not intended to offend the legislative institution or zany one of its members, adding that it falls within the freedom of expression of opinion in the performance of the legislative institution. The public prosecutor did not find that this act constitutes a crime, but rather a permissible act. At the time, the newspaper's lawyer, Mahmoud Qteishat, said that the decision was considered within the context of the judicial body's support for media freedom, adding that it confirmed the judicial trends in support of freedom of opinion and expression over the past ten years drawn up by the Publications Court.

=== Stomping on the Israeli flag ===
In December 2018, the Israeli government presented an official protest with Jordan, over a photo that spread of the government spokeswoman, Jumana Ghunaimat, stomping on the Israeli flag while she was visiting the headquarters of the trade union complex in the capital, Amman. The newspaper "Yediot Aharonot" (an Israeli newspaper) reported that the Minister of Information stomped on the Israel's flag at the Professional Syndicate Complex in Amman, where a meeting of the Jordanian government was held, headed by Prime Minister Omar Al-Razzaz.

The Israeli Foreign Ministry raised a "strongly worded" protest to Jordan over the image, which angered Tel Aviv officials, and the Jordanian ambassador, Ghassan Al-Majali, was summoned to protest in front of him on Sunday, at the ministry's headquarters, and the media published in the Israeli Broadcasting Corporation, Shimon Aran, in his account on Twitter, A picture of Jumana, trampling on the Israeli flag, adding in a tweet: “A new crisis between Israel and Jordan due to Minister Jumana Ghunaimat stepping on the Israeli flag drawn on the floor of the Professional Syndicate Complex in the capital, Amman.”

In a statement issued by the Jordanian Foreign Ministry spokesman Majid al-Qatarneh, he said that Jordan had informed Israel of its respect for the peace treaty between the two parties, following diplomatic tension resulting from the Jordanian media minister's trampling of the Israeli flag while she was attending an official meeting.

Jordanians interacted on social media with the photo by launching the "Jumana Ghunaimat Represent Me" campaign.

They expressed their pride in their minister and declared their solidarity with her in the face of the "Israeli attack." Others described the minister's movement as spontaneous, and were surprised by Tel Aviv's reaction to the photo, saying that it revealed the superficial thinking of its officials.

Political offices
| Preceded by Mohammad Momani | Minister of State for Media Affairs; 2018–present | Incumbent |
