= 2018 Jordanian protests =

- Part of Second Arab Spring and the Anti-austerity movement
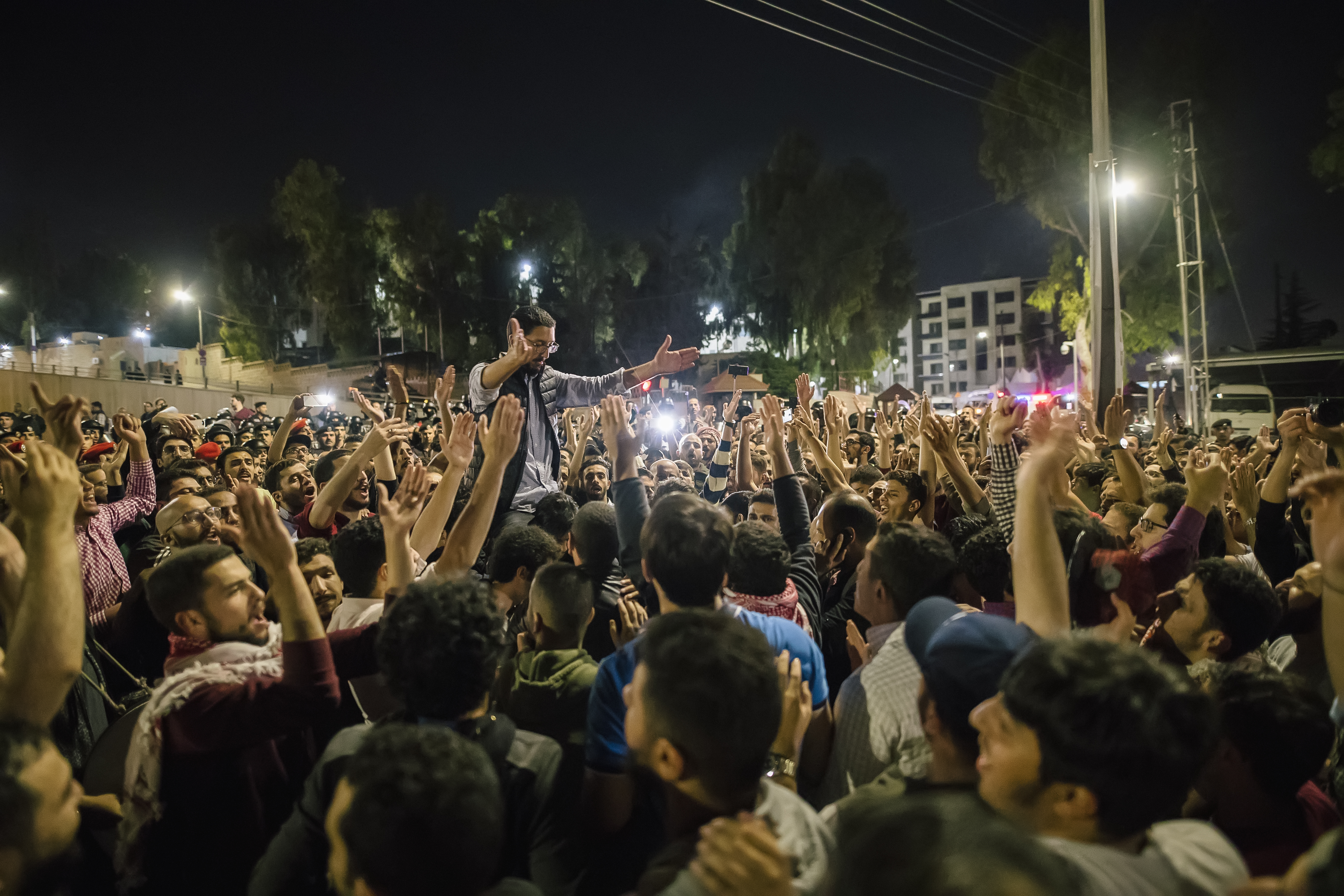
- Protestors at the Fourth Circle where most of the protests took place
- Date: 30 May 2018 – 7 June 2018 (1 week and 1 day)
- Location: Jordan
- Type: Protests, General strike
- Cause: Austerity; Unemployment
- Organised by: Trade unions
- Outcome: Resignation of Hani Mulki's government; Omar Razzaz forms new government; Controversial tax bill withdrawn for further discussion

The 2018 Jordanian protests started as a general strike organized by more than 30 trade unions on 30 May 2018 after the government of Hani Mulki submitted a new tax law to Parliament. The bill followed IMF-backed austerity measures adopted by Mulki's government since 2016 that aimed to tackle Jordan's growing public debt. Although Jordan had been relatively unscathed from the violence that swept the region following the 2011 Arab Spring, its economy had taken a hit from the surrounding turmoil and from an influx of a large number of Syrian refugees into the country. Jordan also hosts a large contingent of Iraqi and Palestinian refugees, further straining its finances. The UNHCR places Jordan as the world's second largest host of refugees per capita.

The day following the strike on 31 May, the government raised fuel and electricity prices responding to an increase in international oil prices. This led to crowds of protesters pouring onto the 4th circle, in Amman, near the Prime Ministry's offices that night. Other Jordanians also gathered across the country in protest of the measure in unprecedented large numbers. On 1 June King Abdullah intervened and ordered the freeze of the price hikes; the government acquiesced but said the decision would cost the treasury $20 million. The protests continued for four days until Mulki submitted his resignation to the King on 4 June, and Omar Razzaz, his Education Minister, became prime minister. Protests only ceased after Razzaz announced his intention of withdrawing the new tax bill.

The protests have not been led by traditional opposition groups like the Muslim Brotherhood or leftists, but by diverse crowds from the middle and poor classes. Although some protesters set aflame tires and blocked roads multiple nights, protests were largely peaceful and few casualties were reported. They were staged after daylight hours as it was during the month of Ramadan.

== Background ==
Jordan's total foreign debt in 2011 was $19 billion, representing 60% of its GDP. In 2016, the debt reached $35.1 billion representing 93% of its GDP. This substantial increase is attributed to effects of regional instability stemming from the Arab Spring causing: decrease in tourist activity; decreased foreign investments; increased military expenditure; attacks on Egyptian gas pipeline supplying the Kingdom; the collapse of trade with Iraq and Syria; expenses from hosting 1.4 million Syrian refugees and accumulated interests from loans. According to the World Bank, Syrian refugees have cost Jordan more than $2.5 billion a year, amounting to 6% of the GDP and 25% of the government's annual revenue. Foreign aid covers only a small part of these costs, while 63% of the total costs are covered by Jordan.

King Abdullah had warned in January 2016 that Jordanians have reached “a boiling point”, and called on donor countries to provide more to Jordan to help it cope with the crises. He told the BBC in an interview that "in the psyche of the Jordanian people I think it's gotten to a boiling point, sooner or later the dam is going to burst." Jordan has historically welcomed refugees—Palestinians in 1948 and 1967, Iraqis during the American invasion and now Syrians, who make up about 20 percent of Jordan's then 9.5 million population—and, according to Abdullah, "For the first time, we can't do it any more." The UNHCR places Jordan as the world's second largest host of refugees per capita.

Rising Jordanian public debt led Prime Minister Hani Mulki in 2016 to negotiate a 3-year program $732 million loan facility with the International Monetary Fund, which would see the public debt falling from 95% of the GDP to 77% by 2021. The austerity program raised prices on several food staples in 2016 and 2017, making him very unpopular in the country. The programme succeeded in preventing the debt from rising above 95% in 2018, however, it strained Jordan's weak economy.

Furthermore, worsening Jordan's conditions is a decision by Persian Gulf countries, like Saudi Arabia and the United Arab Emirates, to withhold $1 billion in annual economic assistance that were directed towards the creation of jobs and economic growth hampered the finances of Jordan, which lacks the natural resources of its neighbors, amassing an unemployment rate of 18% and a much higher poverty rate.

A 22 March 2018 report by Carnegie Endowment for International Peace commented on Mulki's policies: "Mulki declared openly that his predecessors had left the country at the brink of insolvency and that the failure to take tough revenue-raising measure would lead to a debt crisis which would destroy the country. And he is correct. What is more doubtful is Mulki’s assertion that Jordan “will get out of the bottleneck” in 2019. While the measures to raise taxes and reduce subsidies buy time, they leave Jordan struggling to stay afloat and dependent on the continued flow of extensive aid."

On 22 May, the Jordanian Cabinet approved a new draft law proposing changes to the 2014 income tax law. The draft aimed to fight tax evasion and to raise taxes on some sectors and individuals.

Corporate Income Taxation
Sector	Current	Proposed
Banks	35%	40%
Mining companies	24%	30%
Insurance and reinsurance companies	24%	40%
Financial and leasing companies	24%	40%

Personal tax rates
Salary (JOD)	Current	Proposed
1–5,000	7%	5%
5,001–10,000	7%	10%
10,001–15,000	14%	15%
15,001–20,000	14%	22%
20,001+	20%	25%

== Protests ==
The protests started as a general strike organized by more than 30 trade unions on 30 May 2018 after the new tax bill was submitted to Parliament. The day following the strike on 31 May, the government raised fuel and electricity prices responding to an increase in international oil prices. This led to crowds of protesters pouring onto the 4th circle, in Amman, near the Prime Ministry's offices that night. Other Jordanians also gathered across the country in protest of the measure in unprecedented large numbers. Although protests have been largely peaceful and staged after daylight hours during Ramadan, some protesters set aflame tires and blocked roads multiple nights. These protests have not been led by traditional opposition groups like the Muslim Brotherhood or the leftists, but by diverse crowds from the middle and poor classes. On 1 June King Abdullah intervened and ordered the freeze of the price hikes; the government acquiesced but said the decision would cost the treasury $20 million. The protests continued for four days until Mulki submitted his resignation to the King on 4 June, and Omar Razzaz, his Education Minister, was appointed prime minister.

It was reported on June 6 that hundreds were still protesting in Amman. The same day, some trade unions organized a national walkout, while others pulled out following the appointment of Razzaz. This walkout included shops, universities, offices, schools and hospitals.

== Outcome ==
On 7 June, Omar Razzaz met with the trade union leaders and agreed to withdraw the proposed tax bill as soon as a new cabinet was sworn in. Following this announcement, protests in Amman's 4th circle area came to a halt.

Leaders of Saudi Arabia, the United Arab Emirates and Kuwait invited King Abdullah on 11 June to a summit in the Saudi capital. It was announced that the Gulf countries promised $2.5 billion in direct and indirect aid over the course of 5 years. Most of the amount was promised to be deposited at the Central Bank of Jordan to support Jordan's share of foreign currency, while the rest would go to development projects and a smaller portion to direct budgetary support.

Qatar, which Jordan withdrew its ambassador from in June 2017 as part of the boycott of Qatar led by Saudi Arabia, sent its foreign minister three days later to announce $500 million worth of investments in Jordan. Qatar also promised to employ 10,000 Jordanians in its country to help tackle unemployment among young Jordanians.

== See also ==
- 1989 Jordanian protests
- 2011–2012 Jordanian protests
- 2019 Jordanian protests
