= Lina Annab =

Jordanian politician, ambassador (born 1966)

- لينا مظهر عناب
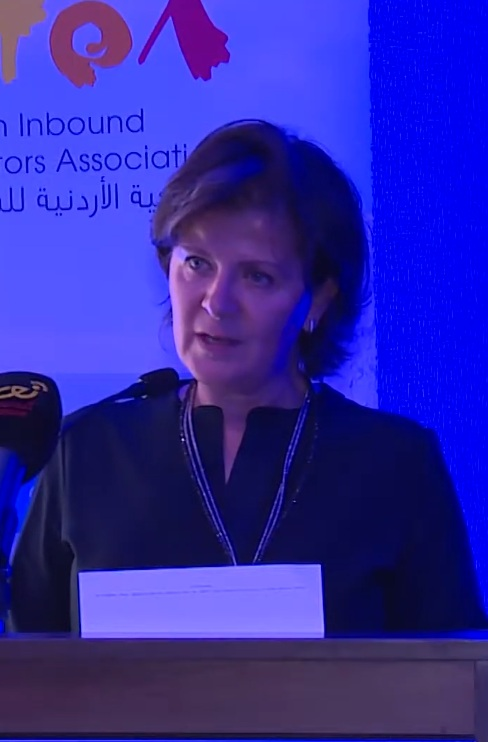
- Annab in 2019

Minister of Tourism and Antiquities
- In office 1 June 2016 – 1 November 2018
- Prime Minister: Hani Mulki; Omar Razzaz
- In office 18 Sept 2024 – 6 Aug 2025
- Prime Minister: Jafar Hassan

Personal details
- Born: November 29, 1966 (age 59)

Lina Mazhar Annab (Arabic: لينا مظهر عناب Līnā Maẓhar ʿAnnāb; born November 29, 1966) is a Jordanian businessperson and politician. She has been the ambassador to Japan since June 19, 2019. Previously she had served as Minister of Tourism and Antiquities.

== Education & career ==
Annab graduated from the University of Hartford with a BA in political economy and foreign languages and literature and from Georgetown University with an MA in international affairs.

She has been a General Manager in Zara Investment Company since 2008. She was made the Minister of Tourism and Antiquities in the cabinet of Hani Mulki in June 2016. She was elected to the board of American Center of Oriental Research, she resigned her position after she was appointed government minister. She patronized the Arab Aviation summit in Jordan on 3 December 2016. She headed the Jordanian delegation to the 41st session of UNESCO’s World Heritage Committee. She helped organize an Opera Festival in Jordan in 2017; which was a first in the Arab world.

Towards the end of Annab's term as the Minister of Tourism and Antiquities, on October 25, 2018, a school bus was raided by fatal heavy floods in Dead Sea region and 21 lives were lost. On November 1 of 2018, the then Minister of Education and Annab submitted their resignations to take responsibility for the incident .

Annab was formally sworn before King Abdullah II as the Jordanian ambassador to Japan. Ambassador Annab presented her letter of credence to Japanese Emperor Naruhito at the Tokyo Imperial Palace on June 19, 2019.

The Emperor of Japan has awarded Annab with the Grand Cordon of the Order of the Rising Sun, in recognition of her outstanding contributions to strengthening bilateral relations between Jordan and Japan during her tenure as ambassador from 2019 to 2024. The Grand Cordon of the Order of the Rising Sun is one of the highest orders bestowed by the Emperor of Japan to individuals - both Japanese and foreign nationals - who have made distinguished achievements in various fields, including international relations, promotion of Japanese culture, advancements in their field, development in welfare or preservation of the environment.
