= Mothanna Gharaibeh =

Jordanian politician

- مثنى غرايبة
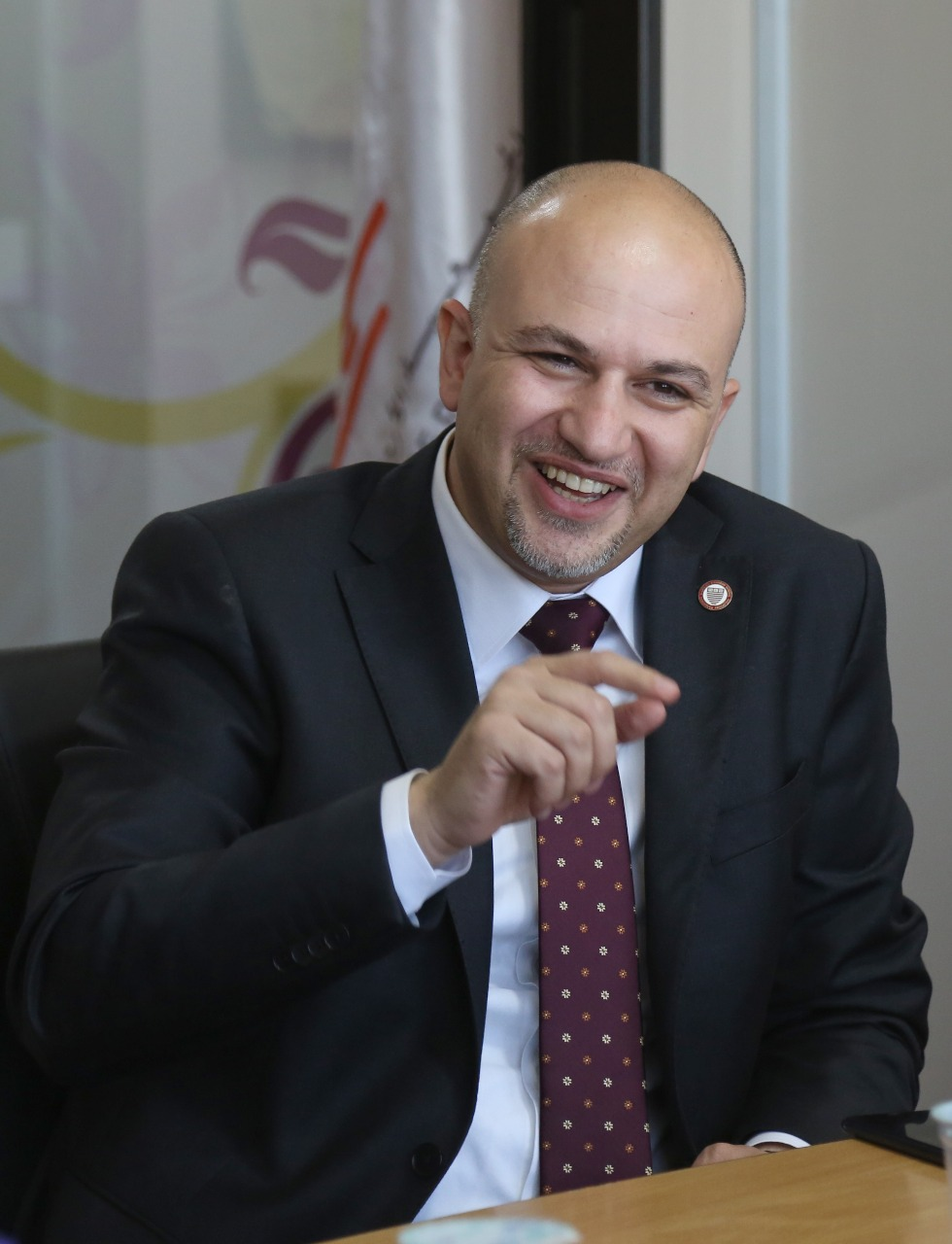
- Gharaibeh in 2018

Minister of Investment
- Incumbent
- Assumed office 18 September 2024
- Monarch: Abdullah II of Jordan
- Prime Minister: Jafar Hassan
- Preceded by: Kholoud Saqqaf

Personal details
- Born: 1980 (age 45–46)
- Education: Yarmouk University (B)

Mothanna Gharaibeh (born 1980) is the Jordanian Minister of Investment. He was appointed as minister on 18 September 2024.

== Education ==
Gharaibeh holds a Bachelor in Telecommunication Engineering from Yarmouk University (2003). He attended programs at the Aspen Institute and the Harvard University.

== Career ==
Gharaibeh was the founder and CEO of the Fifth Expert. He was also member of the Boards of Directors of Jordan’s Information and Communications Technology Association, the Adel Centre for Legal Aid and the “Jordan Progress” platform. Additionally, he was head of Ericsson’s operations in Jordan.

From 2018 to 2020, Gharaibeh served as Minister of Digital Economy and Entrepreneurship.

Since 2024, Gharaibeh has served as Minister of Investment.
