= Musa Habes Almaaytah =

Jordanian politician (born 1954)

- موسى حابس المعايطة (Arabic)
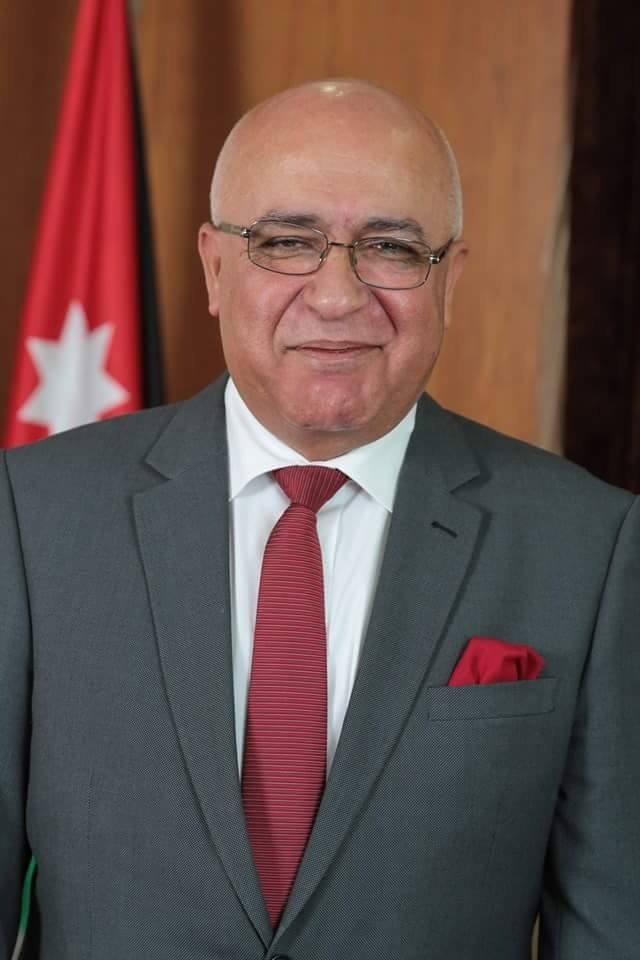
- Born: November 28, 1954 (age 71)
- Education: M.Sc. Electronic Engineering – Communication Technology University of Bucharest, Romania
- Spouse: Rodica George Tudoras Maaytah
- Parents: Habes Musa Saher Al Maaytah (father); Rabeeha Hassan Al Nabulsi (mother)

Musa Habes Almaaytah (Arabic: موسى حابس المعايطة; born November 28, 1954) is a Jordanian politician.

== Early life ==
On paternal side Musa H. Al Maaytah descends from the prominent Jordanian Southern tribe of Al Maaytah. According to various historic records his ancestors, the Maaytahs had moved from the city of Hebron, to settle down on the eastern bank of the river Jordan in the villages of Beteer and Ader, close to the city of Kerak sometime early 19th century.

His great grandfather, Saher Mohammad Al Maaytah was an illustrious leader in Kerak, remembered for his loyalty to the Arab cause, his courage and fearlessness. He was one of the major frontrunners to lead the Kerak uprising against the Ottoman Empire (known as “El-Habeh”) at the beginning of last century. He fought bravely for freedom. The Ottoman authorities got hold of him and ordered his execution by hanging in 1910 in Damascus.

His grandfather Musa Saher Al Maaytah a respected leader of the Maaytah's, Sheikh-Al-Ashireeh, was a peacekeeper; he gained authority and the respect of the tribe through his well-balanced leadership.

Musa Habes Al Maaytah is the first born of Habes Musa Al Maaytah and Rabeeha Hassan Al Nabulsi. Habes M. Al Maaytah, was the second son of Sheikh Musa, and together with his two brothers Lt. General Mohammad Musa Al Maaytah and Mahmoud Musa Al Maaytah, and his only sister Zeina Musa Al Maaytah left the native village of Beteer to get their schooling in Karak and later on pursue a career.

Both brothers of Habes, and uncles of Musa are remembered as fierce officers who fought bravely in the 1948 patriotic war. Lt. General Mohammad Musa Al Maaytah, Musa's eldest uncle was the PSD General Director of Jordan in 1956; he was Member of the Jordanian Parliament for Kerak and Governor of Balqa - Salt in the 1960s. Mahmoud Musa AL-Maaytah was a valiant officer in the Jordanian army; he is remembered for fighting bravely in the Battle for Jerusalem, when the Jordanian army safeguarded the Holy City. Mahmoud, Abu Saher was one of the founders of the Bath Party-the Syrian wing, and a member of the Bath Party Highest Executive Committee until his death. Their only sister Zeina Musa Al Maaytah left the native village of Beteer following her brothers, and after marrying Abdel Aziz Al Maaytah, settled down in Irbed, to be close to her brother Habes and his family.

Habes, Musa's father worked in the state administration holding the position of Governor in some of the major cities of Jordan.

His mother comes from a well-off, educated background; her grandfather, Ismail Hassan Al Nabulsi trader from the city of Nablus, crossed over to the eastern bank of Jordan and settled down in Irbed, sometime at the end of the 19th century. His eldest son, Hassan, Rabeeha's father continued successfully the business of the family, and together with his wife Massara Salah from Damascus raised a wonderful family of three sons and five daughters, all of whom got proper education. All three sons graduated from renowned universities; The eldest son Dr. Ismail Hassan Nabulsi was a medical doctor; the second son Nabih Hassan Al Nabulsi graduated as a Pharmacist from Damascus University and the third son Yahya Hassan Al Nabulsi studied Architecture and graduated from the University of Florence in Italy. The parental house of Musa's mother, a typical Levantine house, a landmark in Irbed has been acquired by the Municipality of the city for its historic value.

Musa H. Al Maaytah has got four brothers and one sister, all holding BA's and Master degrees. Due to his father's appointment to several cities of Jordan, such as Irbed, Jerash, Madaba, Aqaba, Mafraq, Amman (since an administrative Governor could not be appointed to the same region more than one term) Musa moved along with his family and spent his childhood in various cities of the kingdom.

He got his early schooling in the cities where his family trailed the father to conclude his High-school education in Irbed, graduating from Irbed Secondary Boys School- Scientific Stream. After graduation he started studies in engineering at the University of Aleppo, Syria but after a year he interrupted his studies in Syria to move to Romania where he enrolled in Electronic Engineering in the city of Jassy. He completed his Master of Science in Electronic Engineering – The Technology of Telecommunication from the Polytechnic University of Bucharest, Romania.

During his university years he met his future wife Rodica George Tudoras, at that time a student at the Faculty of Philology, of Alexandru Ioan Cuza University. His wife got a BA in Philology, with a major in English Linguistics and a minor in German Language, from Romania; later on, upon moving to the HKJ she completed her studies and received an MA in English Literature from the University of Jordan, Amman.

In 1981 Musa returned to Jordan, and after a short period of time spent at his parents’ house in Irbed, his hometown, he and his wife settled down in Amman.

During Martial Law times in Jordan, a period that coincided with Musa's studies and his return, due to his political activities Musa, who had been appointed to a governmental job as a telecommunication engineer at Marqa International Airport, was turned down and his passport seized by authorities. This situation lasted until 1989 the year that marked the return of democratic life and abolition of the Martial Law in Jordan.

The Martial Law circumstances had an immediate impact on his, and his wife's career. Not being allowed to work in the public sector, Musa started working as an electronic engineer in the private sector while his wife gave up the pursue of an academic career.

== Political activity ==
During his first years of studies Musa materialized his high interest in politics by becoming a party member; he was elected President of the National Union of Jordanian Students in Romania, a position he had held from 1976 until 1981. The Association of Jordanian students in Romania had 3,000.- members.

Upon return to Jordan, and prior to 1989 Musa carried out sustained political partisan activity.

In 1989 Musa was elected as Member of the Jordanian Engineering Association, and Head of the Electrical Division of the Association, a position he had held until 1992.

After the return of party life in Jordan, in 1991, Musa was one of the principal founders of the Jordanian Democratic Socialist Party, whose Secretary General was Issa Madanat. Musa was elected as a member of the Political Bureau in 1992.

In the early 1990s he pledged to work for uniting the left wing of the Jordanian political spectrum under the umbrella of one party. The move succeeded in bringing together The Arabic Democratic Party, The Nationalist Movement, headed by H.E. Mazen Al-Saket, whose members were among others H.E. Samir Habashneh, H.E. Mohammad Daoudieh, Munes Al-Razzaz, in addition to The Progressive Democratic Party headed by Ali Amer. A large number of “Hashd” party members such as Jamil Al Nimri, Bassam Haddadin, Hussein Abu Rumman, H.E. Mustafa Shneikat, as well as other left-wing parties and independent personalities joined in.

Consequently the conference of this broad left-wing movement was held in 1996 . Musa was elected member of the Political Bureau, while Issa Madanat became the President of the party and H.E. Mazen Al-Saket General Secretary. They headed jointly the newly formed Party, at first known under the name of the Jordanian Democratic Unionist Party, which later on, in 1998 became the Jordanian Democratic Party of the Left. Musa Al Mayytah was elected as the Secretary General of the JDPL, and in 2001 and in 2007 was re-elected.

In 1997 Musa put himself up for Parliamentary elections as a representative of the Jordanian Democratic Party of the Left for Al-Karak Governorate. Just a few votes short of winning the seat, Musa returned to his usual partisan activities along with his job as an electrical engineer.

In 2003 Musa Al Maaytah was appointed Member of the Jordan First Commission – the Committee was entrusted with the task of drafting the road map for Party Life Development in Jordan. Musa contributed actively with working papers and interventions to the shaping of party and political life in Jordan.

On February 22, 2009, Musa was appointed Minister of Political Development in the Cabinet of H.E.Nader Dahabi.

Along with his appointment in the Government, as Minister of Political Development back in February 2009, Musa Habes Al Maaytah became a Member of the Ministerial Committee for The Empowerment of Women.

His sustained contribution to the cause of women's emancipation, empowerment and representation at all levels in the public and private sectors of modern Jordan has got renewed recognition by his appointment on November 24, 2019, as Chairman of The Ministerial Committee for Women Affairs in the Cabinet of PM Dr. Omar Razzaz.

Musa is the founder of Al Badil Center for Political Studies and Training.

In 2009, when he was requested to take over the Ministry of Political Development, and due to his appointment as Minister of Political development in the Cabinet of H.E. Nader Dahabi on 22.02.2009 Musa gave up his shares in Al Badil Center for Political Studies and Training, and ceased to work for the company.

Musa H. Al Maaytah contributed with researches and working papers on:

-Political Parties and Their Methods of Financing

- Electoral Systems

- Security and Peace Issues

- The Experience of The Arab Spring

- Women Empowerment

- The Concept of the Civil National State

- The Concept of Democracy and its Impact in the Modern World

Musa was invited to, and contributed with work-papers in a series of Conferences and Conventions at International and Local Level, such as:

-The Euro-Mediterranean Dialogue

- Conferences on the concept of the Civil National State

- Conferences and Congresses of the International Socialist (IS)

- Conventions on the Palestinian Issues

- Conferences on Security, Peace Issues

- Conferences on The Experience of Revolutions (the Arab Spring)

== Memberships ==
- Minister of Political and Parliamentary Affairs (October 2020 – October 27, 2022 in the Cabinet of H.E. Dr. Bisher Alkhasawneh)
- Minister of Political and Parliamentary Affairs (2018 – October 2020 in the Cabinet of H.E. Dr. Omar Razzaz).
- Chairman of The Ministerial Committee for Women Affairs (November 24, 2019 – until present)
- Minister of Political and Parliamentary Affairs (September 2016- June 2018 in the Second Cabinet of H.E. Dr. Hani F. Al Mulki)
- Minister of Political and Parliamentary Affairs (June 1, 2016 – September 25, 2016 in the first Cabinet of H.E. Dr. Hani Al Mulki)
- Member of the Jordanian Senate (October 2013- June 2016)
- Minister of Political Development (July 11, 2011 – October 2011) in the Second Cabinet of H.E. Marouf Bakhit)
- Minister of Political Development (November 2010 – February 2011) in the Second Cabinet of H.E. Samir Zaid Al Rifai)
- Minister of Political Development (December 2009 – NOVEMBER 2010) in the First Cabinet of H.E. Samir Zaid Al Rifai)
- Minister of Political Development (February 2009 – December 2009) in the Cabinet of H.E. Nader Dahabi)
- 1994 – 2009 CEO of A’man for Trade and Marketing, specialized in Telecommunication Technology
- Founder of, and General Director of Al Badil Center for Political Studies and Training until his appointment as Minister of Political Development in February, 2009
- In 1994 Musa established his own company in the field of Telecommunication, and from 1994 to 1999 he was co-owner and General Director of Arab Networking Center
- 1989 – 1994 he was the Maintenance Manager at United Triple Company
- 1983-1989 he worked as Maintenance Officer at United Trading Company (UTG)
