= Yasera Ghosheh =

Jordanian politician

- Occupations: Politician and Minister of Public Sector Development

Yasera Ghosheh is a Jordanian businessman, politician and Minister of Public Sector Development.

== Early life and education ==
Yasera Ghosheh completed her undergraduate from the University of Jordan in Law. She completed her M.A. from the University of Jordan and another one in Commercial Law from the Birmingham University. She studied in Dubai School of Government where she got a degree in Negotiation in Leadership. She did a course Strategic Management for leaders of Non – Governmental Organizations from the Kennedy School of Government of Harvard University. In 2003 she attend a course on European Excellence Assessors at the European Foundation for Quality Management and How to Start the Journey towards Excellence course in 2008 at the foundation.

== Career ==
Yasera Ghosheh worked in the Economic and Development of the Royal Hashemite Court as the deputy director in 2002. From March 2004 to March 2006 she worked as the coordinator of The King Abdullah II Award for Excellence in Government Performance and Transparency. From 2005 to 2006 she was a technical advisor at the Minister of State for Public Sector Reform Administration. She was a lecturer at Petra University in the college of business administration and finance, where she worked for nine years. She was the first executive director of King Abdullah II Center for Excellence, working there from 2006 to May 2016. In 2009 she was awarded the Order of Al-Hussain for Distinguished contribution, 2nd class. She was appointed the Minister of State for Public Sector Development on 1 June 2015 in the cabinet of Prime Minister Hani Mulki. She is a Jordanian Senator and was selected as an assistant to the Senate President.
