= Jordan Ahli Bank =

Financial institution in Jordan

- Company type: Public company
- Industry: Financial services
- Founded: 1955
- Headquarters: Queen Noor Street, Shemesani, Amman, Jordan
- Key people: Yousef Mouasher and Suleiman Sukkar, founders
- Products: Banking, credit cards, internet banking, brokerage services
- Website: ahli.com

Jordan Ahli Bank (previously Jordan National Bank) is a Jordanian institution founded in 1955, headquartered in Amman. It has operations in Lebanon, Palestine, and Cyprus. In 2018, 12–13% of the bank's portfolio was represented by lending to SMEs.
