= Hani Mulki =

41st prime minister of Jordan

- هاني الملقي
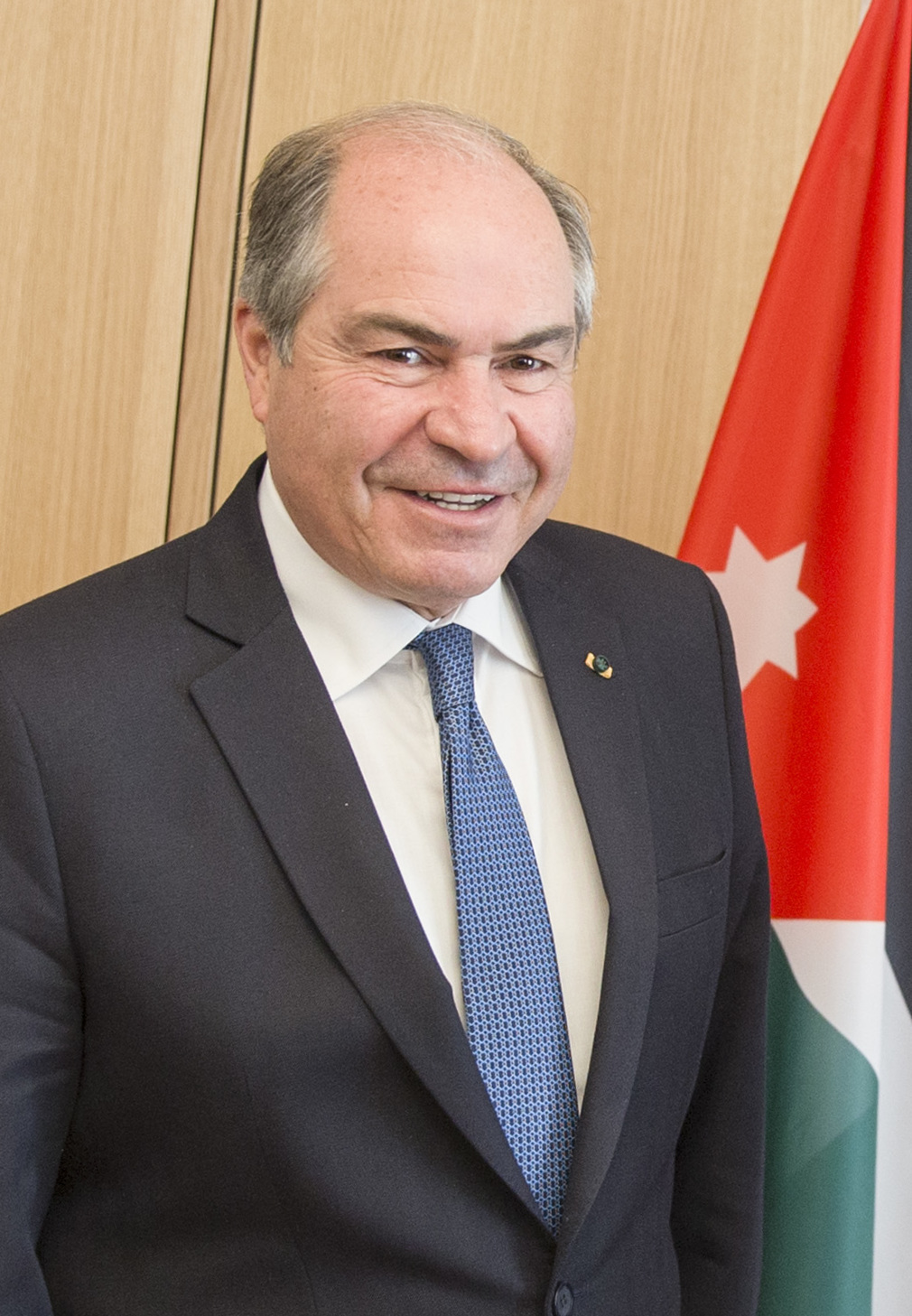

Prime Minister of Jordan
- In office 1 June 2016 – 14 June 2018
- Monarch: Abdullah II
- Preceded by: Abdullah Ensour
- Succeeded by: Omar Razzaz

Chief Commissioner of Aqaba Special Economic Zone Authority
- In office 9 November 2014 – 29 May 2016
- Prime Minister: Abdullah Ensour
- Preceded by: Kamel Mahadin
- Succeeded by: Nasser Shraideh

Minister of Foreign Affairs
- In office 25 October 2004 – 6 April 2005
- Prime Minister: Faisal Al-Fayez
- Preceded by: Marwan al-Muasher
- Succeeded by: Farouq Qasrawi

Personal details
- Born: 15 October 1951 (age 74) Amman, Jordan
- Party: Independent
- Relatives: Fawzi Mulki (Father)
- Education: Cairo University; Rensselaer Polytechnic Institute

Hani Fawzi Mulki (also known as Hani Mulki; Arabic: هاني الملقي; Hāni Al-Mulki; born 15 October 1951) is a Jordanian politician who held several ministerial and diplomatic positions, and he was Chief Commissioner of the Aqaba Special Economic Zone Authority before his designation as the 41st Prime Minister of Jordan by King Abdullah II and approval by the House of Representatives on 29 May 2016.

Mulki served as prime minister until he submitted his resignation on 4 June 2018 after protests had swept the country because of his government's IMF-backed austerity measures that aimed to tackle Jordan's growing public debt. The measures would raise the price of goods and services, as well as hike the tax rate.

== Early life ==
Born in Amman in 1951, into a family of Syrian descent. His father, Fawzi Mulki, was the 10th prime minister of Jordan. Mulki received a bachelor's degree in production engineering in Egypt in 1974 and pursued his Masters and Doctoral degrees from Rensselaer Polytechnic Institute.

== Career ==
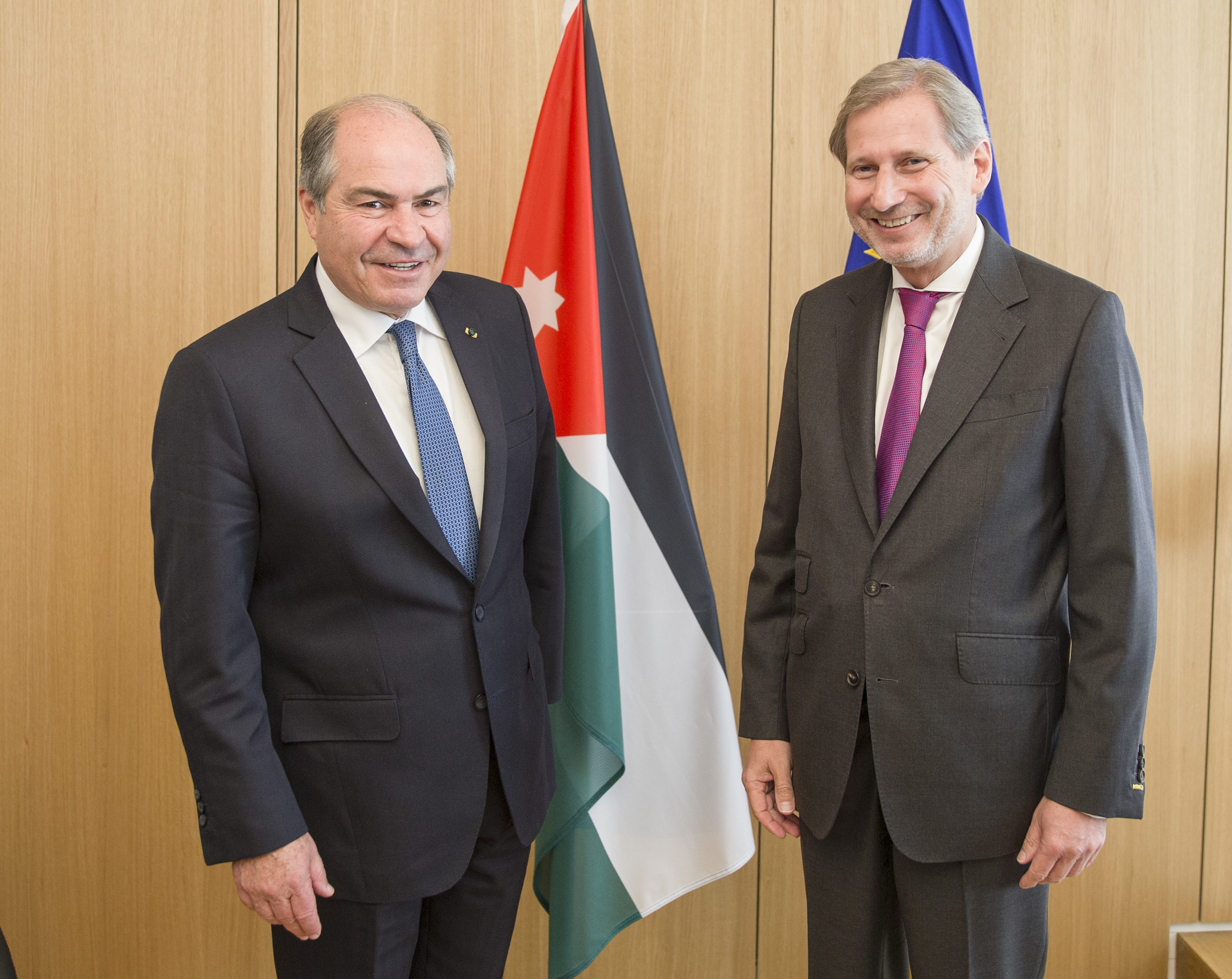
Mulki meets with European Commissioner Johannes Hahn on 5 April 2017

He served as Jordan's ambassador to Egypt and as Jordan's permanent representative at the Arab League. He has held several ministerial positions; water, energy, supplies, industry and foreign affairs ministries.

Mulki chaired the negotiating committee which produced the Israel-Jordan peace treaty between Jordan and Israel in 1994. During his time as foreign minister, Jordan experienced diplomatic issues with both Iraq and Saudi Arabia. Mulki was appointed scientific advisor to the king, and then a member of the Senate. On 9 February 2011, Mulki was reappointed minister of trade and industries. On 9 November 2014, he was appointed chief commissioner of the Aqaba Special Economic Zone Authority, replacing Kamel Mahadin. On 29 May 2016, Mulki was appointed the prime minister of Jordan, succeeding Abdullah Ensour. His cabinet was sworn in on 1 June. After the 2016 general election Mulki ordered a cabinet reshuffle, which resulted in three new portfolios, 22 ministers remaining and the introduction of 7 new ministers.

Rising Jordanian public debt led Mulki in 2016 to negotiate a 3-year program $732 million loan facility with the International Monetary Fund, which would see the public debt falling from 95% of the GDP to 77% by 2021. The austerity program raised prices on several food staples in 2016 and 2017, making him very unpopular in the country. A 22 March 2018 report by Carnegie Endowment for International Peace commented on Mulki's policies: "Mulki declared openly that his predecessors had left the country at the brink of insolvency and that the failure to take tough revenue-raising measure would lead to a debt crisis which would destroy the country. And he is correct. What is more doubtful is Mulki’s assertion that Jordan “will get out of the bottleneck” in 2019. While the measures to raise taxes and reduce subsidies buy time, they leave Jordan struggling to stay afloat and dependent on the continued flow of extensive aid."

A nationwide strike was organized by trade unions on 30 May 2018 in protest of Mulki's government presenting amendments to the 2014 income tax law to Parliament. The next day, his government raised fuel and electricity prices in response to rising international oil prices, prompting crowds of protestors to pour into the 4th circle near the Prime Ministry in Amman. King Abdullah intervened on 1 June and ordered the freeze of price hikes. Mulki's cabinet acquiesced but said the decision would cost the treasury $20 million. Despite the freeze, widespread protests continued due to the tax law. He submitted his resignation on 4 June 2018 and was succeeded by Omar Razzaz, his education minister.

== Honours ==
- Jordan:
  - Grand Master of the Order of Independence
  - Grand Master of the Order of the Star of Jordan
- Japan:
  - Grand Cordon of the Order of the Rising Sun

Political offices
Preceded by Abdullah Ensour	Prime Minister of Jordan; 2016–2018	Succeeded by Omar Razzaz
