= Omar Razzaz =

Prime Minister of Jordan

- عمر الرزاز
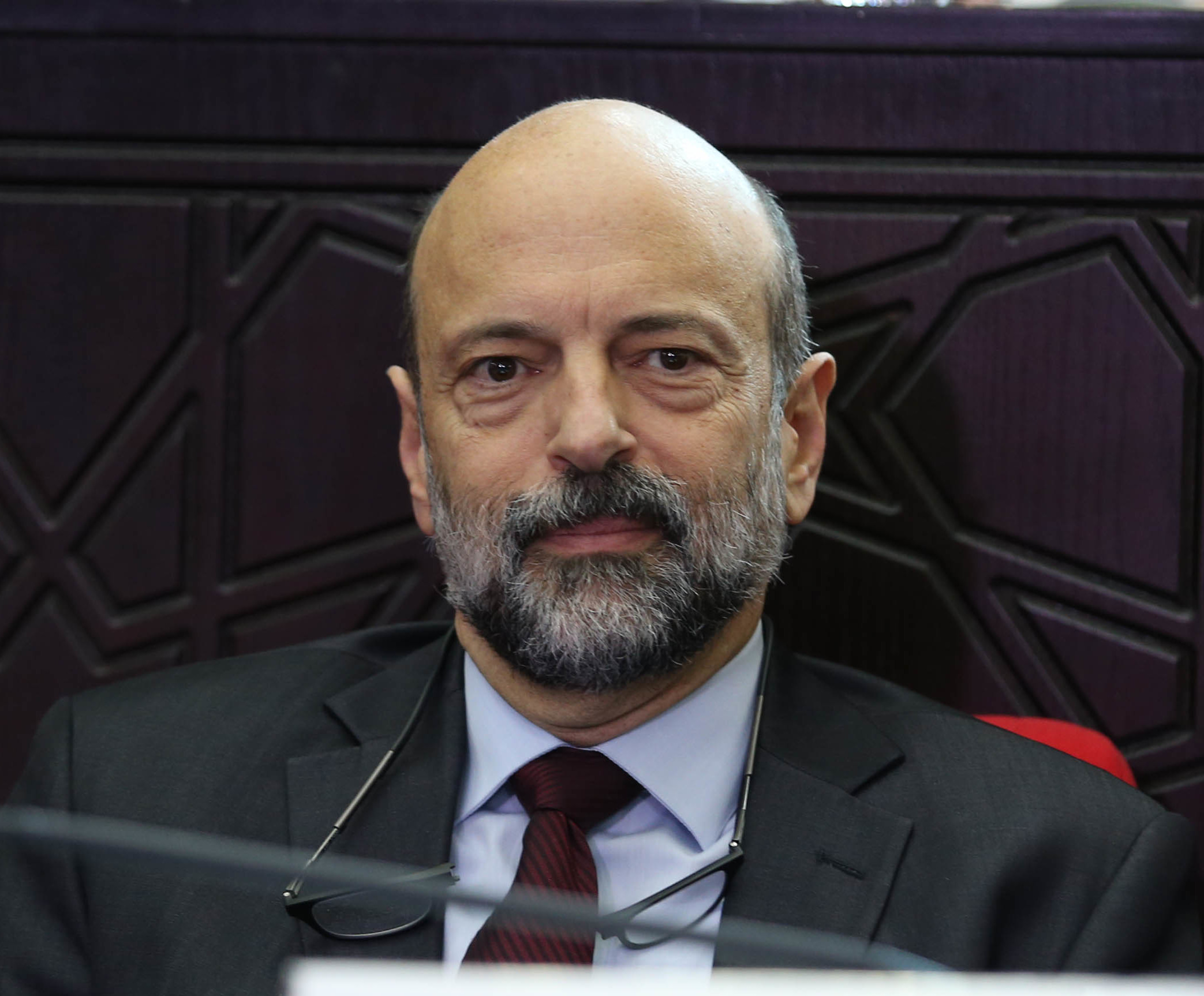
- Razzaz in November 2018

Prime Minister of Jordan
- In office 14 June 2018 – 12 October 2020
- Monarch: Abdullah II
- Preceded by: Hani Mulki
- Succeeded by: Bisher Al-Khasawneh

Minister of Education
- In office 14 January 2017 – 14 June 2018
- Prime Minister: Hani Mulki
- Preceded by: Mohammad Thneibat
- Succeeded by: Azmi Mahafzeh

Personal details
- Born: 17 May 1961 (age 65) Al-Salt, Jordan
- Party: Independent
- Relatives: Munif Razzaz (father), Mu'nis Razzaz (brother)
- Education: Harvard University

Omar Razzaz (Arabic: عمر الرزاز; born 17 May 1961) is a Jordanian politician who served as the 42nd Prime Minister of Jordan from June 14, 2018 to October 12, 2020. He formed a new government on 5 June 2018 after his predecessor resigned as a result of widespread protests against IMF-backed austerity measures in the country.

Born in Al-Salt, Razzaz began his schooling in Amman, later continuing his studies abroad. He was director of several national and international institutions. He was Minister of Education in Hani Al-Mulki's government since 4 January 2017, before his designation as prime minister and he served as Minister of Defense from 14 June 2018 to October 12, 2020.

== Early life ==
Razzaz was born in Al-Salt, Jordan, in 1961 to Lam'a Bseiso (1923–2011) and Munif Razzaz (1919–1984). He was the second of three siblings, with an older brother and a younger sister. His Syrian-born parents' families had moved to Jordan separately in 1925. His mother Lam'a was a political and social activist in Jordan and Palestine and his father Munif was a physician and politician who was elected Secretary General of the National Command of the Syrian Arab Socialist Ba'ath Party in 1965. Munif was imprisoned multiple times by the Jordanian government in the 1950s and 1960s. During Munif's one-year imprisonment in 1963, Lam'a recalls that Omar, then two years old, used to stare at pictures of his father saying "I want him to come to me". Munif relocated to Iraq in 1977 and became a leading member of the Iraqi Ba'ath, but was later arrested as part of Iraqi President Saddam Hussein's 1979 Ba'ath Party Purge. King Hussein had advocated for Munif's release and safe return to Jordan, but Saddam Hussein refused. Munif died in 1984 during house arrest in Baghdad. His wife claimed he was assassinated by the Iraqi Ba'ath after his hypertension medicine was replaced with poison.

== Education ==
Razzaz was enrolled at AUB’s faculty of engineering from 1979 to 1981, a bachelor's degree from Louisiana Tech University, and holds a master’s degree in City Planning from the Massachusetts Institute of Technology (MIT). Razzaz holds a PhD from Harvard University in Planning, with a minor in Economics. He completed his post-doctorate at Harvard Law School.

== Career ==
Razzaz was director of the World Bank in Lebanon between 2002 and 2006. He was director of Jordan's Social Security Corporation between 2006 and 2010. He also served as director of the Jordan Strategy Forum and Jordan's Ahli Bank.

=== Minister of Education ===
In 2017, he joined Hani Mulki's government as Minister of Education. His tenure saw overhauls to Jordan's education system.

=== Prime minister ===
Razzaz appointed a new cabinet that included 16 members from the previous 28-minister government, this was criticized from the public as a complete overhaul of the cabinet was anticipated. However, he included seven women as ministers, the largest female representation in the country's governments history. Razzaz faced a tough task of balancing between international lenders and an angry public. Jordan's debt-to-GDP ratio is 96%, and an unemployment figure of 18.4%, the highest in 25 years. Jordan's economic woes were brought by the turmoil spreading from the Arab Spring when it erupted in 2010. Trade union figures, who led the public protests, threatened to return to the streets if Razzaz does not deliver. Razzaz has promised a more inclusive approach, but has also tried to lower expectations during meetings with legislators and trade union representatives. "There is no magic stick. There is no painkiller. This is a long path, a difficult path. But God willing, the target is clear and the leadership is united with the people in achieving it." In his first cabinet meeting, Razzaz withdrew the income tax bill from Parliament, and promised to have deep discussions about it. The bill was the spark to the protests that led to his predecessor's ouster. On 9 July 2018, Razzaz delivered his first policy statement to the House of Representatives, Jordan's lower house of Parliament. On 19 July, Razzaz gained the confidence of the 130-member House with 79-49 votes. A government in Jordan gains confidence by a majority vote (66 votes) in the lower house.

On 3 October 2020, Razzaz tendered his resignation to King Abdullah II. The king had dissolved the Parliament of Jordan on 27 September and Razzaz was constitutionally obligated to resign within one week. Abdullah II asked Razzaz to stay on as a caretaker until he appointed a successor. On 7 October 2020, the king appointed Bisher Al-Khasawneh as the new prime minister to oversee the upcoming elections, thus ending Razzaz's term as prime minister.

He later became president of the board of trustees at ISUMS

== See also ==
- Cabinet of Omar Razzaz
- 2018 Jordanian protests

Political offices
Preceded by Hani Mulki	Prime Minister of Jordan; 2018–2020	Succeeded by Bisher Al-Khasawneh
