= Cabinet of Jordan =

Led by the Prime Minister who is appointed by the King

The Cabinet of Jordan is led by the Prime Minister who is appointed by the King. The Prime Minister is then free to form his own cabinet which is responsible to the Chamber of Deputies on matters of general policy and can be forced to resign by a two-thirds vote of "no confidence" by that body or be dismissed by the King.

On 18 September 2024, a royal decree by King Abdullah II approved of Jafar Hassan's Cabinet and was sworn in. On 6 August 2025, the cabinet was reshuffled.

== Current Cabinet ==
The current Cabinet of Jordan (Council of Ministers) includes the following members:

Portrait	Office	Incumbent
	Prime Minister and Minister of Defence	Jafar Hassan
	Deputy Prime Minister and Minister of Foreign Affairs and Expatriates	Ayman Safadi
	Minister of Local Administration	Walid Masri
	Minister of Agriculture	Khaled Musa Al Henefat
	Minister of Political and Parliamentary Affairs	Haditha Jamal Haditha Al-Khreisha
	Minister of Government Communication	Mohammad Momani
	Minister of State for Public Sector Development	Badria Al Balbisi
	Minister of Planning and International Cooperation	Zeina Toukan
	Minister of Public Works and Housing	Ahmad Maher Abul Samen
	Minister of Tourism and Antiquities	Imad Hijazin
	Minister of State for Prime Ministry Affairs	Abdul Latif Al Najdawi
	Minister of State for Legal Affairs	Nancy Namrouqa
	Minister of Justice	Bassam Talhouni
	Minister of Industry, Trade, and Supply	Yarub Qudah
	Minister of Labour	Nadia al Rawabdeh
	Minister of Transport	Nidal Katamine
	Minister of Energy and Mineral Resources	Saleh Ali Al-Kharabsheh
	Minister of Finance	Mohamad Al Ississ
	Minister of Awqaf and Islamic Affairs	Mohammad Khalayleh
	Minister of Culture	Haifa Najjar
	Minister of Environment	Ayman Suleiman
	Minister of Social Development	Wafaa Bani Mustafa
	Minister of Education and Higher Education and Scientific Research	Azmi Mahafzah
	Minister of Interior	Mazen Abdellah Hilal al-Frayeh
	Minister of Health	Ibrahim Al Bdour
	Minister of Water and Irrigation	Raed Muzaffar Abu Al Saoud
	Minister of Youth	Raed Adwan
	Minister of Digital Economy and Entrepreneurship	Sami Smeirat
	Minister of Investment	Tareq Abu Ghazaleh

== See also ==
- Hani Al-Mulki's first cabinet
- Hani Al-Mulki's second cabinet
- Omar Razzaz's Cabinet
- Bisher Al-Khasawneh's Cabinet
