= Bisher Al-Khasawneh's Cabinet =

Government of Jordan from 2020 to 2024

Cabinet of Bisher Al-Khasawneh
- Cabinet of Jordan

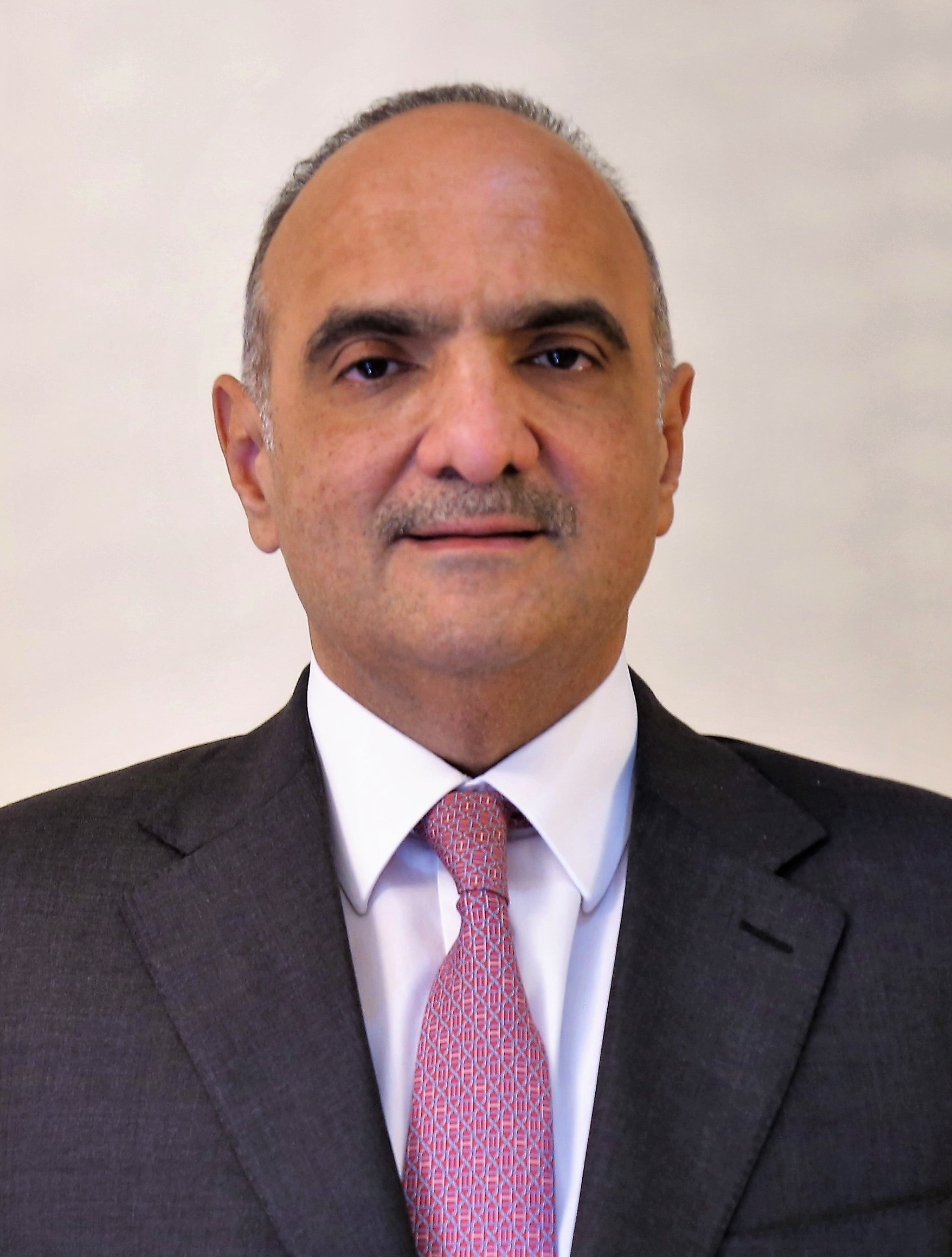
- Date formed: 12 October 2020
- Date dissolved: 15 September 2024

People and organisations
- Monarch: Abdullah II
- Prime Minister: Bisher Al-Khasawneh
- Deputy Prime Ministers: Tawfiq Kreishan; Ayman Safadi
- Member parties: Independent

History
- Election: 2020 general election
- Legislature term: 19th Parliament
- Predecessor: Razzaz Cabinet
- Successor: Hassan Cabinet

Prime Minister Bisher Al-Khasawneh was tasked with forming a cabinet on 7 October 2020. He was sworn in along with his cabinet on 12 October 2020. The two exceptions were Minister of State Mahmoud Kharabsheh who had tested positive for COVID-19, and Minister of State for Follow-up and Government Coordination Nawaf Wasfi Tell who had to follow quarantine requirements after return from abroad.

The cabinet saw reshuffles in March and October 2021, October 2022, and September 2023.

== Cabinet members ==
The Cabinet of Prime Minister and Minister of Defence Bisher Al-Khasawneh included the following members:

Portrait	Office	Incumbent
	Deputy Prime Minister and Minister of Local Administration	Tawfiq Kreishan
	Deputy Prime Minister and Minister of Foreign Affairs and Expatriates	Ayman Safadi
	Minister of Agriculture	Khaled Musa Al Henefat
	Minister of Education and Higher Education and Scientific Research	Azmi Mahafzah
	Minister of State	Wajih Azaizeh
	Minister of Government Communications	Muhannad Al Mubaidin
	Deputy Prime Minister for Economic Affairs and Minister of State for Public Sector Modernisation	Nasser Shraideh
	Minister of Public Works and Housing	Ahmad Maher Abul Samen
	Minister of Transport	Wesam Al Tahtamouni
	Minister of Tourism and Antiquities	Nayef Al Fayez
	Minister of State for Prime Ministry Affairs	Ibrahim Jazi
	Minister of State for Legal Affairs	Nancy Namrouqa
	Minister of Justice	Ahmad Nouri Ziadat
	Minister of Industry, Trade, and Supply	Yousef Shamali
	Minister of Labour	Nadia al Rawabdeh
	Minister of Energy and Mineral Resources	Saleh Ali Al-Kharabsheh
	Minister of Finance	Mohamad Al Ississ
	Minister of Awqaf and Islamic Affairs	Mohammad Khalayleh
	Minister of Culture	Haifa Najjar
	Minister of Social Development	Wafaa Bani Mustafa
	Minister of Interior	Mazin Abdellah Hilal Al Farrayeh
	Minister of Health	Firas Al-Hawari
	Minister of Political and Parliamentary Affairs	Haditha Jamal Haditha Al-Khreisha
	Minister of Water and Irrigation	Raed Abu Soud
	Minister of Youth	Mohammad Salameh Al Nabulsi
	Minister of Digital Economy and Entrepreneurship	Ahmad Hanandeh
	Minister of Investment	Kholoud Saqqaf
	Minister of Planning and International Cooperation	Zeina Toukan

Preceded by Omar Razzaz's Cabinet	Cabinet of Jordan; October 2020–present	Succeeded by
