= Yousef Shamali =

Jordanian politician

Yousef Al Shamali

Minister of Industry, Trade and Supply
- In office 11 October 2021 – 18 September 2024
- Monarch: Abdullah II of Jordan
- Prime Minister: Bisher Al-Khasawneh
- Succeeded by: Yarub Qudah

Minister of Labor
- In office 29 March 2021 – 10 October 2021
- Prime Minister: Bisher Al-Khasawneh
- Succeeded by: Nayef Steitieh

Personal details
- Education: Yarmouk University (B)

Yousef Al Shamali is a Jordanian politician. Previously, he had served as Minister of Industry, Trade and Supply from 11 October 2021 until 18 September 2024. He was Minister of Labor since 29 March 2021 in Bisher Al-Khasawneh's Cabinet led by Prime Minister Bisher Al-Khasawneh.

== Education ==
Shamali holds a Bachelor in Financial Science and Banking from the Yarmouk University.

== Career ==
From 1995 until 2002, Shamali worked as an administrator for the Fertile Crescent Company. Between 2002 and 2005, he was an economic researcher.

In 2005, he was appointed head of the American and European relations department of the Ministry of Industry, Trade and Supply. From 2006 until 2010, he served as the assistant director and from 2010 until 2015, as the director of policies and foreign trade relations at the ministry.

In 2015, Shamali was appointed Secretary General of the Ministry of Industry, Trade and Supply.

Between March and October 2021, he served as the Minister of Labor.

Since 11 October 2021, Shamali has been the Minister of Industry, Trade and Supply.
