= Ayman Safadi =

Jordanian politician (born 1962)

His Excellency Ayman Safadi
- أيمن الصفدي
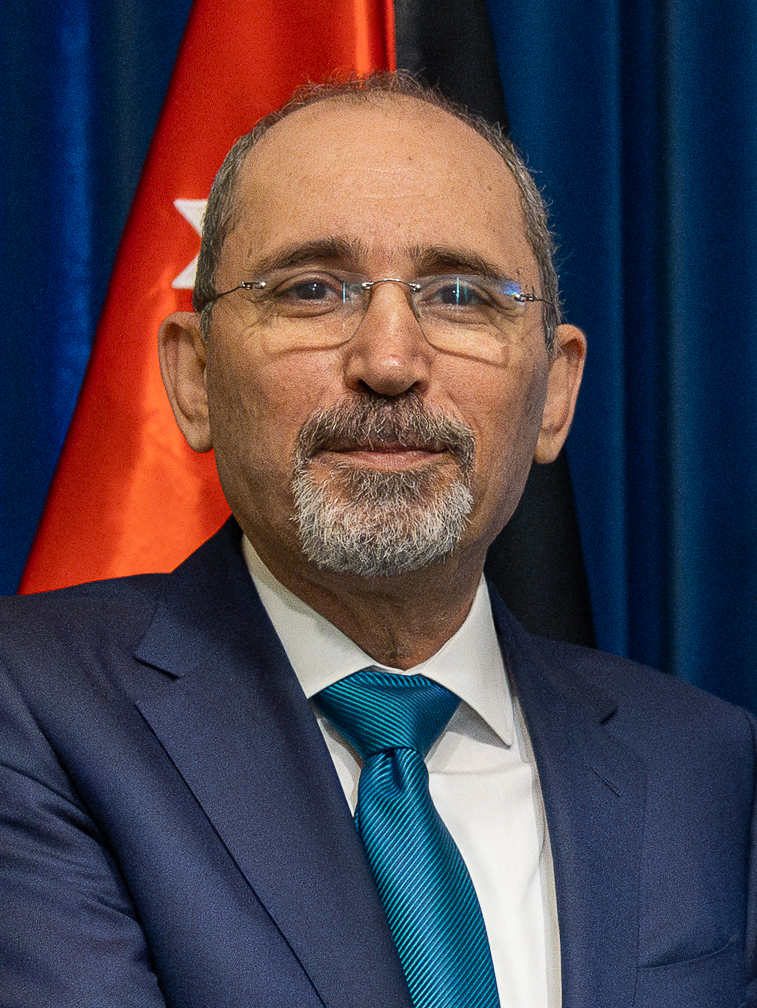
- Safadi in 2024

Deputy Prime Minister of Jordan
- Incumbent
- Assumed office 12 October 2020
- Monarch: Abdullah II
- Prime Minister: Bisher Al-Khasawneh; Jafar Hassan

Minister of Foreign Affairs
- Incumbent
- Assumed office 15 January 2017
- Monarch: Abdullah II
- Prime Minister: Hani Al-Mulki; Omar Razzaz; Bisher Al-Khasawneh; Jafar Hassan
- Preceded by: Nasser Judeh

Personal details
- Born: 1 December 1962 (age 63) Zarqa, Jordan
- Party: Independent
- Education: Yarmouk University (BA); Baylor University (MA)
- Occupation: Journalist

Ayman Safadi (Arabic: أيمن الصفدي, romanized: ʾAyman aṣ-Ṣafadī; born 1 December 1962) is a Jordanian journalist and politician who has served as Deputy Prime Minister since 2020 and as Minister of Foreign Affairs since 2017.

== Biography ==
=== Early life ===
Safadi was born in Zarqa, Jordan, on 15 January 1962, within the Jordanian Druze community. He holds a BA in English literature from Yarmouk University, and an MA in international journalism from Baylor University which he earned in 1992.

=== Journalism ===
He used to write in The Jordan Times. He was CEO of Abu Dhabi Media Company, Director General of Jordan Radio and Television Corporation, editor-in-chief and columnist for the Al-Ghad daily newspaper, and editor-in-chief of The Jordan Times.

In 2015, Safadi was appointed as a member of the board of directors of the Al-Mamlaka TV channel.

He founded in 2014 and is the chief executive officer of Path Arabia, a political and communication strategy company and consultancy that operates out of Abu Dhabi. It focuses on the Middle East.

=== Politics ===
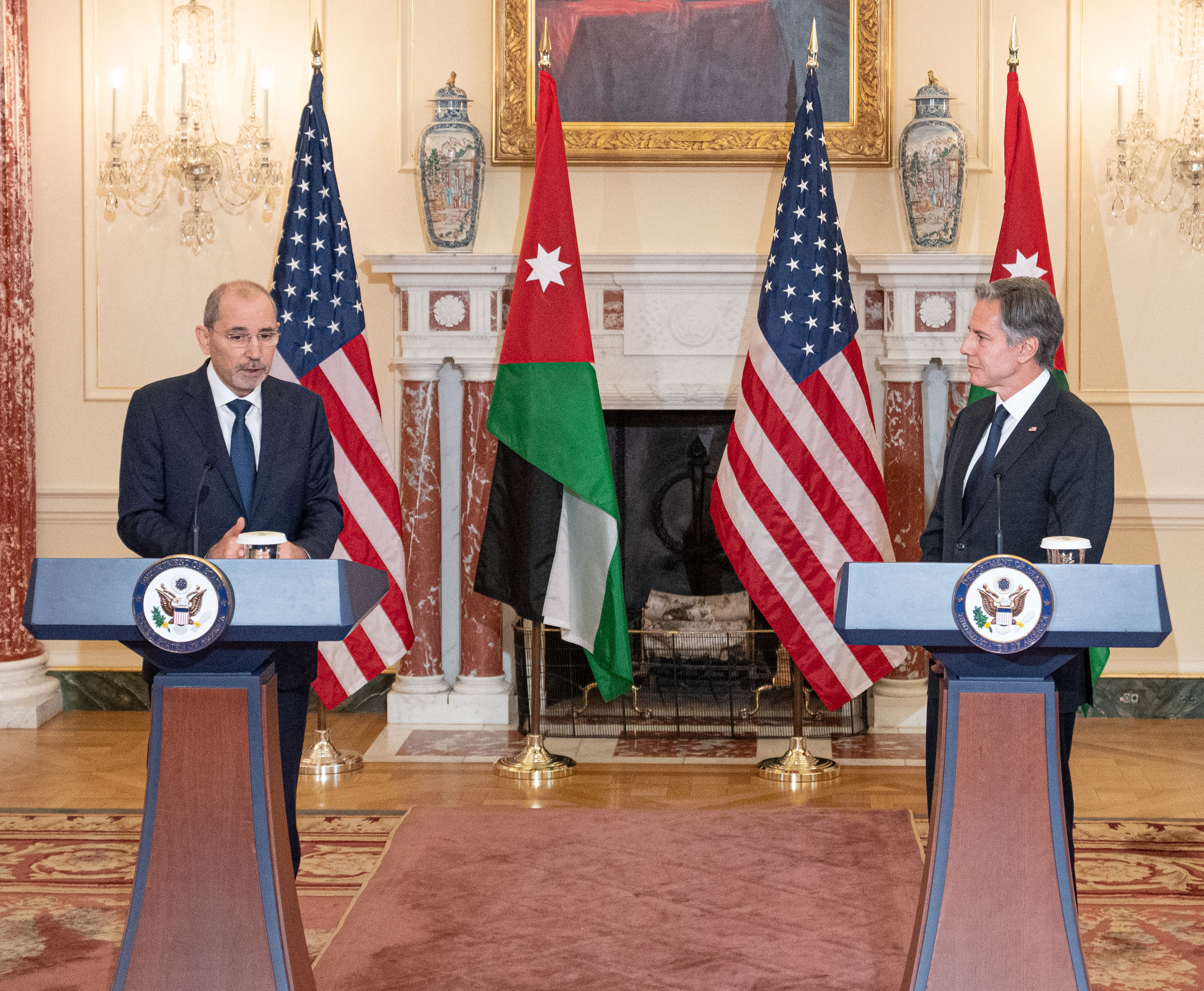
Safadi and US Secretary of State Antony Blinken, 2022.

Between 2008 and 2011, he was an adviser to King Abdullah II at The Royal Hashemite Court, Deputy Prime Minister, Minister of State, and government spokesperson.

Safadi was a member of the Jordanian Senate from September 2016 until his appointment as minister in 2017.

He also was spokesperson for the United Nations Assistance Mission for Iraq (UNAMI).

Safadi was appointed Minister of Foreign Affairs on 15 January 2017, replacing Nasser Judeh. On 12 October 2020, he was also appointed Deputy Prime Minister in Bisher Al-Khasawneh's Cabinet.

In January 2022, Safadi met with United States Secretary of State Antony Blinken in Washington, D. C., to discuss bilateral relations, economic cooperation, and issues in the Middle East including Syrian crisis, two-state solution, and support of Iraq.

== Notes ==
Political offices
Preceded by Nasser Judeh	Foreign Minister of Jordan; 15 January 2017 – present	Incumbent
