= Mohammad Daoudiyeh =

Jordanian politician

Minister of Agriculture
- In office 12 October 2020 – 9 March 2021
- Monarch: Abdullah II of Jordan
- Prime Minister: Bisher Al-Khasawneh
- Succeeded by: Khaled Musa Al Henefat

Mohammad Daoudiyeh is a Jordanian politician. Between 12 October and 10 March 2021, he had served as Minister of Agriculture in Bisher Al-Khasawneh's Cabinet led by Prime Minister Bisher Al-Khasawneh.
