= Nasser Shraideh =

Jordanian politician (born 1967)

- ناصر الشريدة

Deputy Prime Minister for Economic Affairs and Minister of State for Public Sector Modernisation
- Incumbent
- Assumed office 27 October 2022
- Monarch: Abdullah II of Jordan
- Prime Minister: Bisher Al-Khasawneh

Minister of Planning and International Cooperation
- In office 12 October 2020 – 27 October 2022
- Succeeded by: Zeina Toukan

Minister of Environment
- In office 2010–2011
- Prime Minister: Samir Rifai; Marouf al-Bakhit
- Succeeded by: Taher Shakhshir

Personal details
- Born: 1967 (age 58–59)
- Education: Yarmouk University (MSc)
- Cabinet: Bisher Al-Khasawneh's Cabinet

Nasser Sultan Shraideh (born 1967) is the Jordanian Deputy Prime Minister for Economic Affairs and Minister of State for Public Sector Modernisation. He was appointed as minister on 27 October 2022. Previously he had served as Minister of Planning and International Cooperation between 12 October 2020 and 27 October 2022.

== Education ==
Shraideh holds a Bachelor in Economics (1988) and a Master in Economics (1995) from the Yarmouk University.

== Career ==
In 2006, he worked as Secretary General at the Ministry of Planning and International Cooperation. From 2010 until 2011, Shraideh served as Minister of Environment.

In 2016, he was appointed as chief commissioner of the Aqaba Special Economic Zone Authority.

Between 2020 and 2022, he was the Minister of Planning and International Cooperation.

Since 27 October 2022, Shraideh has served as Deputy Prime Minister for Economic Affairs and Minister of State for Public Sector Modernisation.
