= Motasem Saidan =

Jordanian politician

Minister of Water and Irrigation
- Incumbent
- Assumed office 12 October 2020
- Prime Minister: Bisher Al-Khasawneh

Motasem Saidan is a Jordanian politician. As of 12 October 2020, he serves as Minister of Water and Irrigation in Bisher Al-Khasawneh's Cabinet led by Prime Minister Bisher Al-Khasawneh.
