= Saleh Ali Al-Kharabsheh =

Jordanian politician

- صالح الخرابشة

Minister of Energy and Mineral Resources
- Incumbent
- Assumed office 11 October 2021
- Monarch: Abdullah II of Jordan
- Prime Minister: Bisher Al-Khasawneh
- Preceded by: Hala Zawati

Minister of Environment
- In office 2019 – 11 October 2021
- Monarch: Abdullah II of Jordan
- Prime Minister: Omar Razzaz; Bisher Khasawneh
- Succeeded by: Muawieh Radaideh

Personal details
- Education: University of Burdwan (BSc); University of Jordan (MSc); University of Florida (PhD)

Saleh Ali Al-Kharabsheh is the Jordanian Minister of Energy and Mineral Resources. He was appointed as minister on 11 October 2021.

== Education ==
Kharabsheh holds a Bachelor in Mechanical Engineering (1991) from the University of Burdwan, a Master in Mechanical Engineering (1994) from University of Jordan and a PhD in Renewable Energy (2003) from the University of Florida.

== Career ==
From 1991 until 1994, Kharabsheh worked as a teaching assistant at the University of Jordan.

In 1994, he was a mechanical engineer.

Between 1994 and 1995, he worked as a teaching assistant at the Higher Institute of Industrial Technology in Libya. From 1995 until 2000, Kharabsheh was an engineer at the Ministry of Planning.

In 2001, he was awarded a fellowship of the United Nations Framework Convention on Climate Change (UNFCCC) Secretariat in Germany. He worked as a research assistant at the University of Florida from 2001 until 2003.

Between 2003 and 2005 he was an assistant professor at Hashemite University.

In 2006, Kharabsheh was appointed director of the projects department at the Ministry of Planning and International Cooperation. In addition, he was the acting director of the policies and studies department of the ministry in 2008 and 2009.

From 2009 until 2017, he served as the Secretary General of the Ministry of Planning and International Cooperation.

In 2017, he was appointed Minister of Energy and Mineral Resources.

In 2019, he was appointed Minister of Environment.

Since 11 October 2021, Karabsheh has been the Minister of Energy and Mineral Resources.

== Awards ==
- Book award, the highest degree in a graduation project by the University of Burdwan
- Academic Achievement Award by the University of Florida
