= Khairy Amr =

Jordanian politician

Khairy Yasser Abdel Moneim Amr

Minister of Investment
- In office 11 October 2021 – 27 October 2022
- Monarch: Abdullah II of Jordan
- Prime Minister: Bisher Al-Khasawneh
- Succeeded by: Kholoud Saqqaf

Khairy Yasser Abdel Moneim Amr is a Jordanian politician. He had served as Minister of Investment from 11 October 2021 until 27 October 2022.
