= Mohammad Salameh Al Nabulsi =

Jordanian politician

Mohammad Nabulsi
- محمد سلامة النابلسي

Minister of Youth
- In office 7 October 2020 – 6 August 2025
- Monarch: Abdullah II of Jordan
- Prime Minister: Bisher Al-Khasawneh
- Preceded by: Fares Braizat
- Succeeded by: Raed Adwan

Personal details
- Born: Mohammad Salameh Al Nabulsi
- Education: American University of Beirut (B); London School of Economics (MSc)

Mohammad Salameh Al Nabulsi is a Jordanian politician. He had served as Minister of Youth from 12 October 2020 until 6 August 2025.

== Education ==
Al Nabulsi holds a Bachelor in Political Studies (2004) from the American University of Beirut and a Master in Development Studies (2007) from London School of Economics.
