= Faisal Shboul =

Jordanian politician

Minister of Government Communications
- In office 27 October 2022 – 27 September 2023
- Monarch: Abdullah II of Jordan
- Prime Minister: Bisher Al-Khasawneh
- Succeeded by: Muhannad Al Mubaidin

Minister of State for Media Affairs
- In office 11 October 2021 – 27 October 2022
- Monarch: Abdullah II of Jordan
- Prime Minister: Bisher Al-Khasawneh

Personal details
- Education: Lebanese University (BS)

Faisal Shboul is a Jordanian politician. Previously he had served as Minister of State for Media Affairs from 11 October 2021 until 27 October 2022 and as Minister of Government Communications from 27 October 2022 until 27 September 2023.

== Education ==
Shboul holds a Bachelor of Journalism from the Lebanese University.

== Career ==
From 2002 to 2003, Shboul was the Secretary General of the Media Ministry. From 1999 until 2006, Shboul was the Director General of the Jordan News Agency. In addition, he held the same position from 2012 to 2018.

Between 2006 and 2008, Shboul worked as the Director General of the Jordan Radio and Television Corporation.
