= Jordan Maritime Authority =

- الهيئة البحرية الأردنية

Agency overview
- Formed: November 1, 2002; 24 years ago
- Jurisdiction: Jordanian government
- Headquarters: Aqaba (Jordan)
- Agency executives: Wesam Al Tahtamouni, Chairman; Ahmad Mohammad Al-Assasleh, Director General
- Website: www.jma.gov.jo

The Jordan Maritime Authority (Note: Sometimes translated as the "Jordan Maritime Commission" instead.) (JMA, الهيئة البحرية الأردنية) is a government agency with the responsibility of governing the Red Sea and domestic ports, sea roads and shipping of Jordan. It was established in 2002 by Royal Decree and functions in conjunction with the Ministry of Transport. It is headquartered in Aqaba.

== Responsibilities ==
The JMA is responsible for implementing the provisions of the SOLAS Convention and the International Ship and Port Facility Security Code on all Jordan-flagged ships and all ships in Jordan's territorial waters. It approves training standards for security officers at ports and aboard ships. In addition, it is solely responsible for issuing licenses to engage in maritime activity to ships operating in Jordanian waters except in the Aqaba Special Economic Zone (ASEZ), which is administered by the ASEZ Authority in conjunction with the JMA.

Other services provided by the JMA includes providing health certificates for vessels docking at Jordanian ports, conducting inspections, and arranging maintenance and repairs. The JMA was also a participant in the SafeMed II Project, in conjunction with the European Maritime Safety Agency.

The Director-General of the JMA represents Jordan at the Executive Council of the Arab Academy for Science, Technology and Maritime Transport. Ahmad Mohammad Al-Assasleh was appointed to the role in July 2026.

== History ==
Prior to the establishment of the JMA, responsibility for regulation of maritime transport operators in Jordan was split between the Ministry of Transport and the Ministry of the Interior, causing bureaucratic inefficiencies. For this reason, the JMA was established in 2002, and all responsibility was given over to it.

In order to harmonize Jordan's licensing frameworks with those of international regulatory bodies (i.e. SOLAS and the ISPS Code), the JMA held a forum in January 2004 and began the implementation of frameworks the next month.

During the COVID-19 pandemic in Jordan, the JMA was responsible for managing Jordan's ports and maritime traffic to comply with disease-prevention restrictions.

== See also ==
- Politics of Jordan
- Transport in Jordan
