= Firas Al-Hawari =

Jordanian politician

Ministry of Health
- Monarch: Abdullah II of Jordan
- Prime Minister: Bisher Al-Khasawneh; Jafar Hassan
- Preceded by: Nathir Obeidat
- Succeeded by: Ibrahim Al-Bdour
- In office 29 March 2021 – 5 August 2025

Personal details
- Born: Firas Ibrahim Al-Hawari

Firas Ibrahim Al-Hawari was the Jordanian Minister of Health between 29 March 2021 – 5 August 2025. He was succeeded by Ibrahim Al-Bdour on 6 August 2025.

== Education ==
Hawari holds a bachelor's degree in medicine from the University of Jordan (1992) and completed an Internal Medicine Residency (1996) and a Clinical Pharmacology Fellowship at the University at Buffalo (1997) and a Pulmonary and Critical Care Fellowship at University of Irvine (2000).

== Career ==
From 2000 until 2004, Al-Hawari worked as a Senior Staff Fellow at the American National Institutes of Health in Bethesda in the United States. In 2007, Al-Hawari was the chairman of the Institutional Review Board for Scientific Research at King Hussein Cancer Center. In 2008, he became director of the Smoking Cessation Program at King Hussein Cancer Center. Additionally, he was director of the Respiratory Therapy Unit and Pulmonary Function Laboratory from 2004 until 2021, head of the Department of Chest Diseases and Intensive Care from 2010 until 2018, and a member of the executive board at King Hussein Cancer Center from 2013 until 2021.

From 2018 until 2021, Al-Hawari served as the head of the Cancer Control Office.

In 2020, he was appointed head of the National Center for Epidemiology and Communicable Diseases.

Since 29 March 2021, Al-Hawari has been Minister of Health.
