= HIV/AIDS in Jordan =

HIV Epidemiology in Jordan

- Specialty: Epidemiology
- Prevalence: Low (estimated 380 PLWHA in 2007)

HIV/AIDS in Jordan is characterized by a low prevalence rate compared to other regions, but the situation remains a concern due to potential for increase and the social and economic consequences that could result. As of 2007, the UNAIDS estimated that there were approximately 380 people living with HIV/AIDS (PLWHA) in Jordan. Despite the relatively low numbers, the country faces challenges in addressing the epidemic, including inadequate surveillance systems, limited adoption of preventive practices, and persistent stigma and discrimination against PLWHA.

The Jordanian Ministry of Health (MOH) reported 550 diagnosed cases of HIV/AIDS in Jordan as of December 2007, with 60% of transmissions occurring through sexual contact. However, the actual number is believed to be higher due to under-reporting. Jordan's national response to HIV/AIDS is managed through the MOH National AIDS Program (NAP) and includes strong political commitment, the formation of a National AIDS Committee, and the provision of antiretroviral (ARV) drugs for Jordanian citizens who test HIV-positive. In 2005, Jordan launched its National HIV/AIDS Strategy (2005–2009) with the key goal of maintaining low HIV prevalence among the population and all vulnerable sub-populations. The country has also received funding from the Global Fund to Fight AIDS, Tuberculosis and Malaria to strengthen and expand existing HIV/AIDS prevention, care, and support activities since 2003.

== Prevalence ==
Jordan has low HIV/AIDS prevalence, but if preventive measures are not implemented, HIV/AIDS and other communicable diseases could increase or re-emerge and have significant social and economic consequences.

In 2007, there were an estimated 380 people living with HIV/AIDS (PLWHA) in the region, according to UNAIDS. Although figures are low compared with Southern Africa or Asia, they are still a cause for alarm, particularly since they are rising rapidly, especially among high-risk groups, such as injecting drug users (IDUs) and vulnerable youth. Systematic monitoring of the epidemic, however, is far from complete. Surveillance systems remain inadequate in their coverage of at-risk groups and thus fail to reflect risk behaviors or provide incidence and prevalence rates.

In addition to weak surveillance, the adoption of preventive practices is very limited, the participation of PLWHA and civil society in the HIV/AIDS response is still nascent, and despite some progress, general attitudes, institutions, and laws often do not facilitate implementation of an expanded response. The first step in addressing the spread of HIV/AIDS is recognizing the presence of the disease and the sociocultural, political, and economic patterns that fuel and bear the burden of its impact.

Although the Ministry of Health (MOH) reported that 550 cases of HIV/AIDS were diagnosed in Jordan as of December 2007, the actual number is thought to be much higher due to under-reporting. For those cases diagnosed, the routes of transmission included 16.5 percent through blood and blood products, 60 percent through sexual transmission, and 3.3 percent through injection drug use. Perinatal HIV transmission accounted for 1.5 percent, and 18.2 percent of cases were of unknown transmission route. In addition, a significant number of diagnosed HIV/AIDS cases are from foreigners in Jordan (185 Jordanians and 365 non-Jordanians). Since the first case of HIV/AIDS in Jordan was diagnosed in 1986, 85 Jordanians have died of AIDS. Little is known about HIV prevalence rates in high-risk populations in Jordan.

A 2003 assessment conducted of about 1,200 women presenting to obstetrics and gynecological clinics in urban centers in Amman, Zarka, and Rusaifah showed a prevalence of gonorrhea of 0.7 percent, chlamydial infection of 1.2 percent, trichomoniasis of 1.2 percent, bacterial vaginosis of 5.4 percent, and candidiasis of 19.1 percent. Regional variations indicate that rates are much higher in some sites than in others. No syphilis infection was identified.

Stigma and discrimination against PLWHA prevails, as 29 percent of ever-married women surveyed in the 2002 Demographic and Health Survey were unwilling to care for PLWHA at home, while 63.5 percent of young people responding to a knowledge, attitude, practice, and behavior study believed that AIDS patients should be isolated.

Jordan's cultural sensitivities pose the greatest threat to the country's low prevalence. Because of difficulties in discussing sexual matters, many Jordanians still harbor misconceptions about HIV/AIDS and PLWHA. A 2005 study of the general population (USAID/JHU/HCP: 2005 Communication Partnership for Family Health Baseline Survey, Key Results) found that talking about HIV/AIDS is still taboo and that PLWHA still face stigma and discrimination. For instance, 65 percent of women and men said people with the AIDS virus should not be allowed to work with others in shops, offices, or on farms, even if they are not feeling sick. Many people responding to the survey did not understand how to prevent HIV/AIDS and did not know that condoms can be used for this purpose.

At an estimated two new cases of tuberculosis (TB) per 100,000 people (WHO 2005), TB incidence in Jordan is relatively low. Currently, fewer than 1 percent of adult TB patients are HIV-positive. However, continued monitoring is necessary because an increase in the incidence of HIV-TB co-infection could add to the complexity of fighting both diseases in Jordan.

== National response ==
Jordan's national response to HIV/AIDS is characterized by strong political commitment to addressing HIV. The response is managed through the MOH National AIDS Program (NAP) and includes the formation of a National AIDS Committee and the appointment of an AIDS program manager. The MOH continues to support the national blood transfusion service, mandatory HIV testing, strong control measures for foreigners who reside in Jordan, and provision of antiretroviral (ARV) drugs for Jordanians who test HIV-positive. There are currently 12 part-time focal point persons who are responsible for HIV/AIDS in all governorates of the country.

In 2005, Jordan launched the National HIV/AIDS Strategy (2005–2009), outlining the key goals, objectives, and initiatives for the response. The key goal is to maintain low HIV prevalence among the population and all vulnerable sub-populations of Jordan.

Jordan has received funding from the Global Fund to Fight AIDS, Tuberculosis and Malaria to strengthen and expand existing HIV/AIDS prevention, care, and support activities since 2003. In July 2007, the MOH was granted $1.25 million from the Global Fund to maintain low HIV prevalence among its population.
