= Maritime Authority =

Maritime Authority may refer to:

- Australian Maritime Safety Authority
- Maritime and Port Authority Brunei Darussalam
- Bahamas Maritime Authority
- Danish Maritime Authority
- Jordan Maritime Authority
- Malta Maritime Authority
- Maritime and Port Authority of Singapore
- Norwegian Maritime Authority
- New Zealand Maritime Authority
- Portugal Maritime Authority
- South African Maritime Safety Authority

== See also ==
- Maritime (disambiguation)
