= Hani Khasawneh =

Jordanian politician (born 1939)

Hani Al-Khasawneh (born 1939) is a Jordanian former minister and member of the Ba'ath Party. He is the father of the current prime Minister of Jordan Bisher Al-Khasawneh. He was appointed as Minister of Youth in the cabinet of Ahmad Obeidat in 1984، In 1988 he was appointed Minister of Media in the Zaid Rifai's final cabinet, which ended in 1989. In this role, he was instrumental in having US political correspondent Rick Davis expelled from Jordan. Prior to the fall of Saddam Hussein, Khasawneh was described as "an outspoken proponent of Iraq and a peddler of conspiracy theories".

== See also ==
- Awn Al-Khasawneh
- Bisher Al-Khasawneh's Cabinet
