= REMPEC =

The Regional Marine Pollution Emergency Response Centre for the Mediterranean Sea (REMPEC) assists the Mediterranean coastal States in ratifying, transposing, implementing and enforcing international maritime conventions related to the prevention of, preparedness for and response to marine pollution from ships. The Centre also implements activities within the framework of a number of externally funded projects and programmes, such as the EU funded SafeMed II Project and the GEF/UNDP/IMO GloBallast Project.

REMPEC is one of the Regional Activity Centres of the Mediterranean Action Plan (UNEP/MAP) and is administered by the International Maritime Organization (IMO). The Centre was established in 1976 and is hosted by the Government of Malta.

== Goals ==
The role of REMPEC is to contribute to preventing and reducing pollution from ships and combating pollution in case of emergency. Its main objectives are :

- To strengthen the capacities of the coastal States in the Mediterranean
- To facilitate co-operation among them in case of a major marine pollution incident and to obtain assistance from outside the region if necessary
- To assist coastal States of the Mediterranean region which so request in the development of their own national capabilities for response to pollution incidents
- To facilitate information exchange, technological co-operation and trainings

== See also ==
- Barcelona Convention
- Specially Protected Areas of Mediterranean Importance
