= Nancy Namrouqa =

Jordanian politician (born 1974)

- نانسي نمروقة

Minister of State for Legal Affairs
- Incumbent
- Assumed office 18 September 2024
- Monarch: Abdullah II of Jordan
- Prime Minister: Bisher Khasawneh; Jafar Hassan
- Preceded by: Wafaa Bani Mustafa

Personal details
- Born: June 1, 1974 (age 52) Amman, Jordan
- Education: Amman Arab University (Ph.D.)

Nancy Namrouqa (born 1 June 1974) is the Jordanian Minister of State for Legal Affairs. She was appointed on 18 September 2024.

== Education ==
Namrouqa holds a Doctor of Philosophy in Public Law (2016) from the Amman Arab University.

== Career ==
Namrouqa was an advisor in the Prime Ministry and in the Legislation and Opinion Bureau.

Namrouqa served as the Minister of State for Legal Affairs from 27 October 2022 as part of Prime Minister Bisher Khasawneh's government.

She was appointed as Minister of State for Foreign Affairs on 18 September 2024 in Jafar Hassan's government.
