= JID (disambiguation) =

JID (born 1989) is an American rapper.

JID, Jid, or jid may also refer to:

- Journal of Investigative Dermatology, academic journal
- Jordan Institute of Diplomacy, Jordanian institute
- Jabber ID, XMPP address
- Jurong Innovation District, district in Singapore
- Jid River, river in Romania
- Bu language, ISO 639 code jid
