= Muawieh Radaideh =

Jordanian politician (born 1969)

Muawieh Khalid Radaideh
- معاوية الردايدة

Minister of Environment
- In office 11 October 2021 – 6 August 2025
- Monarch: Abdullah II of Jordan
- Prime Minister: Bisher Al-Khasawneh
- Preceded by: Nabil Masarweh
- Succeeded by: Ayman Suleiman

Personal details
- Born: October 7, 1969 (age 56)
- Education: Brigham Young University (PhD)

Muawieh Khalid Radaideh (born 7 October 1969) is a Jordanian politician. He had worked as Minister of Environment from 11 October 2021 until 6 August 2025.

== Education ==
Radaideh holds a PhD in civil and environmental engineering from the Brigham Young University.
