= Wajih Azaizeh =

Jordanian politician (born 1955)

- وجيه عزايزة

Minister of State for Prime Ministry Affairs
- In office 27 September 2023 – 5 August 2025
- Monarch: Abdullah II of Jordan
- Prime Minister: Bisher Al-Khasawneh
- Preceded by: Ibrahim Jazi

Minister of Transport
- In office 7 March 2021 – 27 October 2022
- Succeeded by: Ahmad Maher Abul Samen

Minister of Social Development
- In office 2012–2013
- Prime Minister: Awn Khasawneh; Fayez Tarawneh; Abdullah Ensour
- Succeeded by: Khawla Armouti

Minister of Political and Parliamentary Affairs
- In office 27 October 2022 – 26 September 2023
- Monarch: Abdullah II of Jordan
- Prime Minister: Bisher Al-Khasawneh
- Preceded by: Musa Habes Almaaytah
- Succeeded by: Haditha Jamal Haditha Al-Khreisha

Personal details
- Born: Wajih Tayeib Azaizeh; 1955 (age 70–71) Irbid, Jordan
- Education: University of Aleppo (B)

Wajih Tayeib Azaizeh (born 1955) is a Jordanian politician. He had worked as minister of state for prime ministry affairs from 27 September 2023 until 5 August 2025. Previously he had served as minister of transport from 7 March until 27 October 2022 and minister for political and parliamentary affairs from 27 October 2022 until 26 September 2023.

== Education ==
Azaizeh holds a Bachelor in Civil Engineering (1979) from the University of Aleppo.

== Career ==
In 2008, Azaizeh was the director-general of the Palestinian Affairs Department. From 2012 until 2013, he served as Minister of Social Development.

== Awards ==
In 2007, Azaizeh received the Independence Medal of the First Order.
