= Ayman Riad Saeid Almuflih =

Jordanian politician (born 1962)

Ayman Ryad Saeed Almuflih

Ministry of Social Development
- In office 12 October 2020 – 27 October 2022
- Monarch: Abdullah II of Jordan
- Prime Minister: Bisher Al-Khasawneh
- Succeeded by: Wafaa Bani Mustafa

Personal details
- Born: Ayman Ryad Saeed Almuflih; 1962 (age 63–64)

Ayman Ryad Saeed Almuflih (born 1962) is a Jordanian politician. Previously he served as Minister of Social Development from 12 October 2020 until 27 October 2022.
