= Tawfiq Kreishan =

Jordanian politician

Tawfiq Mahmoud Hussein Kreishan
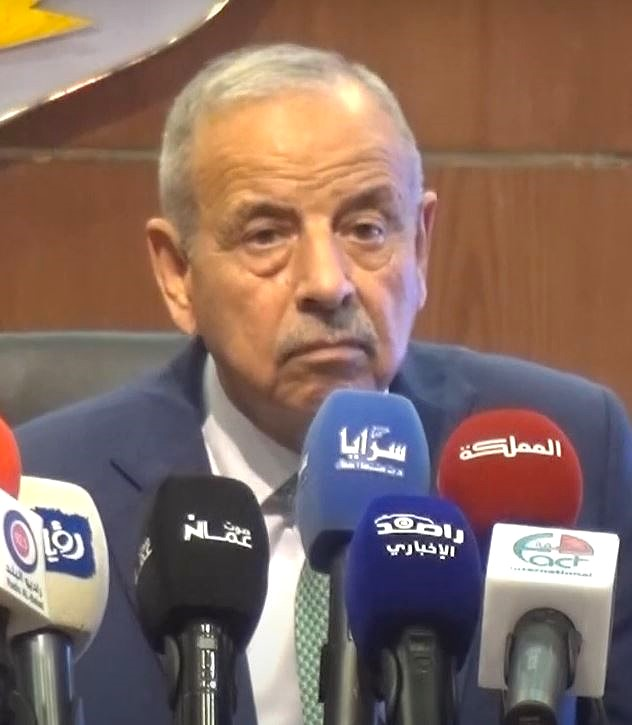

Minister of Municipal Affairs
- In office 12 October 2021 – 15 September 2024
- Monarch: Abdullah II of Jordan
- Prime Minister: Bisher Al-Khasawneh

Personal details
- Born: 1947 (age 78–79) Ma'an (Jordan)
- Education: Beirut Arab University (Lebanon)

Tawfiq Kreishan (Arabic : توفيق كريشان ) (born 1947) is a Jordanian politician serving as Deputy Prime Minister and Minister of Municipal Affairs in Bisher Al-Khasawneh's Cabinet from 12 October 2020 to September 15, 2024 .

He graduated in accounting and business administration from Beirut Arab University. He was a member of the Senate, and was minister of Parliamentary affairs twice. He was also minister of Municipal Affairs five times. The first time he became a minister was in 1996. Before that he became a member of Parliament five times; twice in the Lower house, and three times in the Senate.

== In office ==
Kreishan was part of the Jordanian government for many different terms.

Term start	Term end	Office	Head of government
12 October 2021		Deputy Prime Minister and Minister of Local Administration	Bisher Al-Khasawneh
2 July 2011	17 November 2011	Deputy Prime Minister and Minister of Parliamentary Affairs	Marouf al-Bakhit
28 July 2010	22 November 2010	Minister of Parliamentary Affairs	Samir Rifai
14 December 2009	22 November 2010	Minister of Parliamentary Affairs	Samir Rifai
7 April 2005	24 November 2005	Minister of Municipal Affairs	Adnan Badran
21 July 2003	22 October 2003	Minister of Parliamentary Affairs	Ali Abu al-Ragheb
4 March 1999	18 June 2000	Minister of Municipal and Rural Affairs and Environment, Minister of Parliamentary Affairs	Abdelraouf al-Rawabdeh
21 August 1998	4 March 1999	Minister of Municipal and Rural Affairs and Environment	Fayez al-Tarawneh
19 March 1997	20 August 1998	Minister of Municipal and Rural Affairs and Environment	Abdelsalam al-Majali
8 June 1994	7 January 1995	Minister of Municipal and Rural Affairs	Abdelsalam al-Majali

== Political experience ==
- 1993-1997 Member of Parliament
- 1994-1995 Minister of Municipal Affairs
- 1997-1998 Minister of Municipal Affairs
- 1998-1999 Minister Of Municipal Affairs
- 1998-2000 Member of The

Senate

- 1999-2000 Minister of Municipal and Parliamentary Affairs
- 2003 minister of Parliamentary Affairs
- 2005 minister of Municipal Affaird
- 2007-2009 Member of the Chamber of Deputies
- 2009-2010 Minister of Parliamentary Affairs
- 2010 minister of parliamentary Affairs
- 2010 Member of the Senate
- 2011 Deputy Prime Minister

== Decorations and honours ==
- Grand Cordon of the Order of the Star of Jordan
