= Yarub Qudah =

Qatari politician

- يعرب القضاة

Minister of Industry, Trade, and Supply
- Incumbent
- Assumed office 18 September 2024
- Monarch: Abdullah II of Jordan
- Prime Minister: Jafar Hassan
- Preceded by: Yousef Shamali

Personal details
- Born: October 23, 1972 (age 53)

Yarub Qudah (born 23 October 1972) is the Jordanian Minister of Industry, Trade and Supply. He was appointed as minister on 18 September 2024.

== Education ==
Qudah holds a Bachelor in Industrial Engineering from Jordan University (1995).

== Career ==
From 2006 to 2014, Qudah was CEO of the Jordan Enterprise Development Corporation (JEDCO). Between 2013 and 2015 and 2018 and 2020, he was vice chairman of the board of trustees for the King Abdullah II Fund for Development. Additionally, from 2014 to 2016, he served as executive vice chairman and general manager for the MENA region of Petra Solar.

In 2016, Qudah was appointed as minister of industry, trade and supply, a position he held until 2018.

Between 2020 and 2023, he was chairman of the board of the Jordanian Pharmaceutical Manufacturing Company. From 2023 to 2024, he served as vice chairman of Avdali Investment and Development and chairman of the National Resources Investment & Development Corporation.

Since 2024, Qudah has served as minister of industry, trade and supply.

Qudah is chairman of the Jordan Enterprise Development Corporation.
