= Ibrahim Al-Bdour =

Jordanian politician

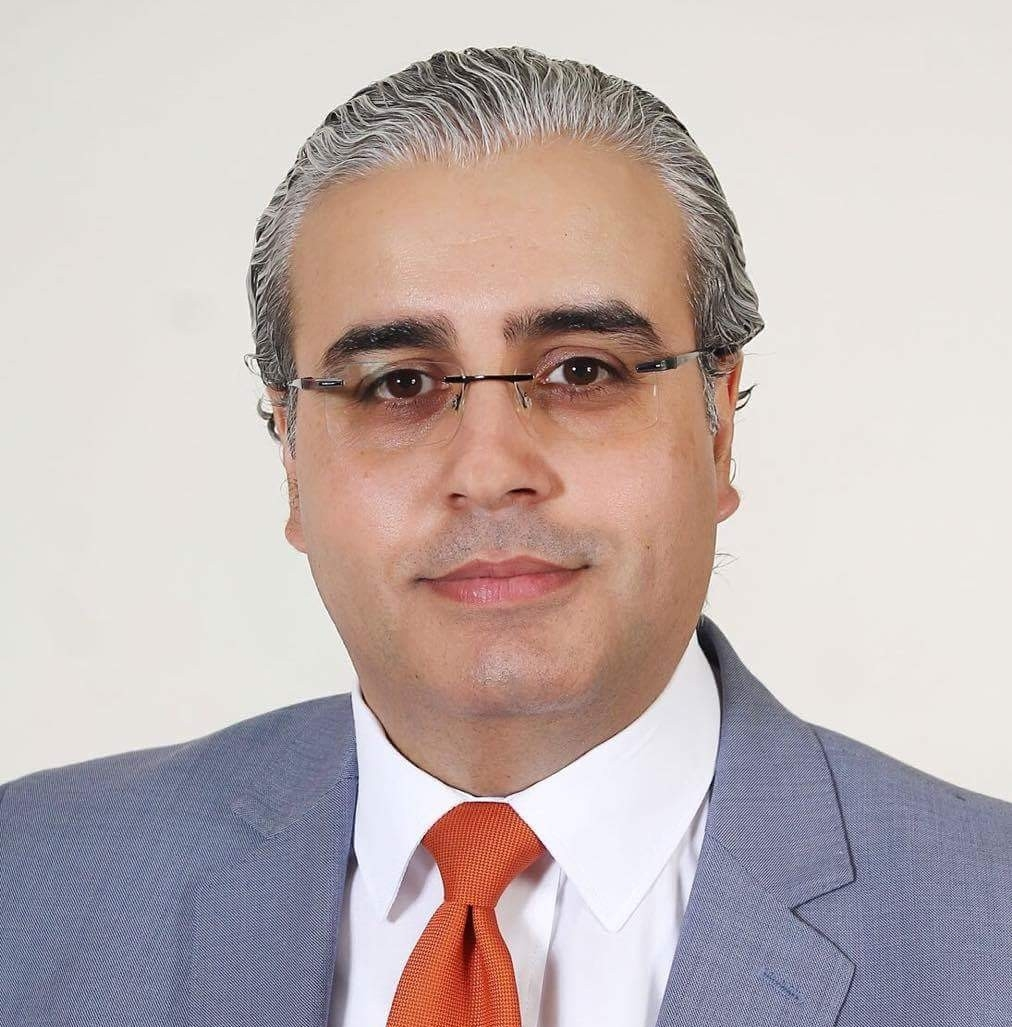

Ministry of Health
- Monarch: Abdullah II of Jordan
- Prime Minister: Jafar Hassan
- Preceded by: Firas Al-Hawari
- Incumbent
- Assumed office 6 August 2025

Personal details
- Citizenship: Jordan
- Profession: Neurosurgeon
- Mother Language: Arabic

Ibrahim Mahfouth Al Bdour is a Jordanian Doctor specialized in neurosurgery. He has been appointed as Minister of Health in Jordan Ministry of Health in a government amendment by Jafar Hassan government on 6 August 2025.

== Career ==
In 2018, Al Bdour was Chairman of the Health and Environment Committee in the Jordanian Parliament and Chairman of the Education and Culture Committee in the Jordanian Parliament in 2019. From 2016 to 2018 he was Head of the Watan Parliamentary Bloc.

He was a member of the Jordanian House of Representatives elected in 2016, and a member of the Senate of Jordan in 2022.

Since 2019, he has been Chairman of the Education and Health Committee at the National Center for Human Rights in Jordan.

On August 6, 2025, he was sworn in as Minister of Health before King Abdullah II of Jordan at Al-Husseiniya Palace.
