= Mohammad Khalayleh =

Jordanian politician (born 1967)

- محمد الخلايلة
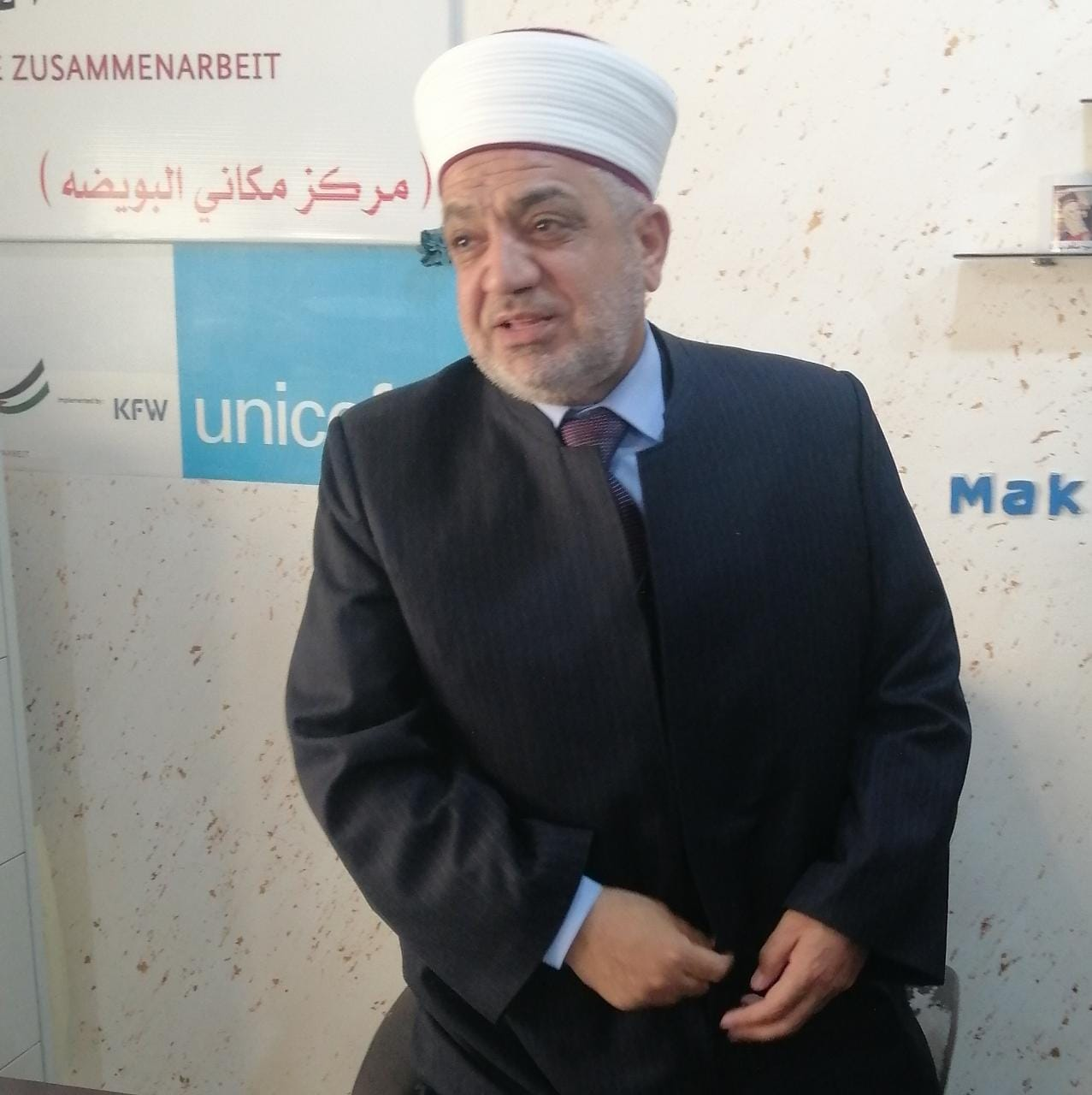
- Khalayleh in 2023

Minister of Awqaf Islamic Affairs and Holy Places
- Incumbent
- Assumed office 7 November 2019
- Monarch: Abdullah II of Jordan
- Prime Minister: Omar Razzaz; Bisher Al-Khasawneh; Jafar Hassan
- Preceded by: Abdulnasser Abu El-Bassal

Personal details
- Born: 1967 (age 58–59)

Mohammad Ahmad Muslim Al Khalayleh (born 1967) is the Jordanian Minister of Awqaf Islamic Affairs and Holy Places. He was appointed as minister on 7 November 2019.
