= Ibrahim Jazi =

Jordanian politician (born 1966)

Ministry of State for Prime Ministry Affairs
- In office 12 October 2020 – 27 September 2023
- Monarch: Abdullah II of Jordan
- Prime Minister: Bisher Al-Khasawneh
- Succeeded by: Wajih Azaizeh

Ministry of State for Legal Affairs
- In office 24 October 2011 – 2 May 2012
- Prime Minister: Awn Shawkat Al-Khasawneh

Minister of Justice
- In office 12 April 2012 – 2 May 2012
- Prime Minister: Awn Shawkat Al-Khasawneh

Personal details
- Born: Ibrahim Mashhour Al Jazi; 15 January 1966 (age 60) Jordan
- Parent: Mashour Haditha Al-Jazy (father)
- Education: Damascus University (LL.B); University of Essex (LL.M); University of London (PhD)

Ibrahim Mashhour Al Jazi (Arabic: إبراهيم مشهور حديثة الجازي; born 15 January 1966) is a Jordanian politician. He served as Minister of State for Prime Ministry Affairs from 12 October 2020 until 27 September 2023. Jazi also served as Minister of State for Legal Affairs and as Minister of Justice in 2011 and in 2012.

== Education ==
Jazi holds a Bachelor of Laws from Damascus University, a Master in International Law from the University of Essex and a Doctor of Philosophy in International Law from the University of London.

== Career ==
Al Jazi is a lawyer of international law, human rights issues and environmental law. He has been senior partner at a law firm since 2003.

Between 2011 and 2012, Al Jazi served as the Minister of State of Legal Affairs.

In 2012, he worked as Minister of Justice.

From 2013 until 2014, Al Jazi worked as Dean of the School of Law and as assistant to the president of Amman Arab University.

In 2014, he was appointed Dean of the Faculty of Law at the University of Jordan. Additionally, he worked as the director of the Office of Legal Affairs Department at the University of Jordan for 8 years.

From 12 October 2020 until 27 September 2023, Al Jazi had been Minister of State for Prime Ministry Affairs.
