= Specially Protected Areas of Mediterranean Importance =

Sites for conservation specific to the Mediterranean

Specially Protected Areas of Mediterranean Importance (SPAMI) are sites "of importance for conserving the components of biological diversity in the Mediterranean; contain ecosystems specific to the Mediterranean area or the habitats of endangered species; are of special interest at the scientific, aesthetic, cultural or educational levels".

== Context ==
The Protocols are part of a wider international effort aimed at protecting the Mediterranean Sea, i.e. the MAP, a programme co-ordinated by UNEP the origins of which go back to the Barcelona Convention of 1976 for Protection against Pollution in the Mediterranean. Similar plans exist for other regional seas around the world. Treaties and protocols providing for the specific protection of certain sites in these regions have also been adopted.

== The SPAMI List ==
The 1995 Protocol provides for the establishment of a List of SPAMI. SPAMI may be created both within areas of national jurisdiction and on the high seas. The decision to include an area in the SPAMI List is taken by consensus by the contracting parties during their periodic meetings. The protection and management measures applying in the SPAMI are those prescribed by the States proposing them but all parties are to comply with such measures. The Ligurian Sea Cetacean Sanctuary is the largest of the SPAMI sites.

== The RAC-SPA ==
The Regional Activity Centre for Specially Protected Areas (RAC/SPA) was established by the Contracting Parties to the Barcelona Convention in order to help the Mediterranean countries implement the 1995 Protocol. It is based in Tunis, as part of a host agreement signed in 1991 between Tunisia and UNEP.

== See also ==
- REMPEC
