= Mahmoud Kharabsheh =

Jordanian politician

Minister of State for Legal Affairs
- In office 7 March 2021 – 11 October 2021
- Prime Minister: Bisher Al-Khasawneh
- Preceded by: Ahmad Ziadat
- Succeeded by: Wafaa Bani Mustafa

Minister of State
- In office 12 October 2020 – 7 March 2021
- Prime Minister: Bisher Al-Khasawneh

Personal details
- Born: 1951 (age 74–75)

Mahmoud Kharabsheh (also spelled Mahmud al-Kharabsha) (Arabic: محمود الخرابشة; born 1951) is a Jordanian politician and lawyer. He was a member of the House of Representatives in the 12th through 17th parliaments. He served multiple terms as Head of House Legal Committee. He served as Minister of State in Bisher Al-Khasawneh's government between 12 October 2020 and 11 October 2021, from 7 March 2021 he held the charge of Minister of State of Legal Affairs.

== Political career ==
In 1999 he opposed amending Article 340 of the law, which lessened the punishment or exonerated those who killed family members for harming family honor. In October 2007, he once more said that it will take a long time for Jordanian society to change its attitude towards honour killings.

While in his position of Head of House Legal Committee in early 2000, Kharabsheh accused Issam al-Rawabdeh, the son of Jordanian Prime Minister Abdelraouf al-Rawabdeh, of corruption. After the charges al-Rawabdeh shuffled his cabinet, the move was seen as a way to lessen criticism against himself.

After a new parliament was elected in 2003, several temporary laws were up for review. Two of those were related to women's rights: Article 340 called for the same reduction of punishment for women as perpetrator in honour killings, and the Khuloe law gave women the right to file for divorce without giving a reason in return for her wedding dowry. Kharabsheh said he would vote against the Khuloe law as he saw it to be in contradiction of the sharia law. He also said that "women would destroy the family if divorce was in their hands".

In June 2009 he called for the resignation of Omar Rimawi, President of Al-Balqa` Applied University, for his involvement in financial and administrative corruption. Shortly thereafter Mahmud's nephew Atef al-Kharabsha was appointed as advisor to Rimawi.

In January 2012 Kharabsheh was against nuclear power as a source for Jordan's energy. He cited high costs and lower than expected uranium supplies as the main problems for the construction of a nuclear energy plant.

In March 2012 he claimed that the proposed Jordans 2012 Passports Law violated the Vienna Convention on Diplomatic Relations. As a consequence of the law, both current and former Prime Ministers, Ministers, Representatives, Senators and other high-ranking officials were entitled to diplomatic passports. Kharabsheh, as Head of the House Legal Committee voted against the amendments together with one other representative. The other seven members of the Committee voted for the changes.

By April 2012 in his position as Head of House Legal Committee Kharabsheh declared that the House of Representatives had full powers to change the elections bill related to the 2013 Jordanian elections.

After the January 2013 election, he stood candidate as Speaker of the House of Representatives, however, he was eliminated in the first round of voting after receiving 5 of the 150 available votes. Saad Hayel Srour won the election in the second round.

In November 2017 Kharabsheh was present at a group interview on sexual harassment for Deutsche Welle and clashed with the moderator after questioning the authenticity of a woman speaking of her experiences. Kharabsheh left the interview. He subsequently stated he would sue Deutsche Welle for contempt of Jordan.

=== Minister ===
On 12 October 2020 he was appointed as Minister of State in Bisher Al-Khasawneh's government. Due to Kharabsheh having been tested positive for COVID-19 he was not sworn in with the rest of the cabinet. In a cabinet reshuffle on 7 March 2021 he became Minister of State of Legal Affairs.

In October 2021 he announced that the cabinet had no plans to decriminalize lèse-majesté after the king ordered a special pardon in some cases of lèse-majesté. His term ended on 11 October 2021 and he was succeeded by Wafaa Bani Mustafa.

=== Post-minister ===
In January 2022 he criticized those introducing amendments to the Constitution of Jordan as: "they are playing with the constitution".
