= Nayef Steitieh =

Jordanian businessman and politician (born 1965)

- نايف استيتية

Minister of Labour
- In office 11 October 2021 – 27 October 2022
- Monarch: Abdullah II
- Prime Minister: Bisher Khasawneh
- Preceded by: Yousef Shamali
- Succeeded by: Yousef Shamali

Personal details
- Born: Nayef Zakaria Nayef Steitieh; 1965 (age 60–61) Jabal al-Luweibdeh, Amman, Jordan
- Education: University of Jordan
- Occupation: Businessman, politician
- Known for: Founder of the Business Development Center
- Awards: Order of King Abdullah II for Excellence, second class (2018)

Nayef Zakaria Steitieh (Arabic: نايف زكريا استيتية; also spelled Stetieh or Estetieh; born 1965) is a Jordanian businessman and politician who served as Minister of Labour in the government of Bisher Khasawneh from October 2021 to October 2022. In 2004 he founded the Business Development Center (BDC), a Jordanian non-profit organisation that works on training for employment, entrepreneurship and support for small and medium-sized enterprises, and he has served as its chief executive. In 2018 King Abdullah II awarded him the Order of King Abdullah II for Excellence, second class, for founding and managing the centre and for founding its Maharat and Sanad programmes.

== Early life and education ==
Steitieh was born in 1965 in Jabal al-Luweibdeh, Amman, and began his schooling at the Terra Sancta school. In 1980 he went to the United Kingdom to study English, then returned to Jordan and earned a bachelor's degree in business administration from the University of Jordan.

He holds a higher diploma as a certified management consultant from the International Trade Centre in Geneva, and has completed two executive education programmes at Harvard University, in leadership and organisation and in future leadership. He also holds a leadership certificate from Duke University and a certificate in marketing and brand management from the Thunderbird School of Global Management.

== Career ==
=== Private sector and business associations ===
Steitieh worked in the private sector before starting his own business. He contributed to founding several sector business associations, including the Information and Communications Technology Association of Jordan (Int@j) and the exporters' associations for stone and marble, garments, olive products and furniture. He also took part in establishing the King Abdullah II Award for Excellence for the private sector.

=== Business Development Center ===
Steitieh founded the Business Development Center in 2004 as a Jordanian non-profit organisation and became its chief executive. The centre works on preparing young people for the labour market, self-employment, support for micro and small enterprises, and the economic empowerment of women and local communities, and has delivered training programmes in Jordan and several other Arab countries.

Through the centre, Steitieh founded the Maharat and Sanad programmes, both based on training for employment and entrepreneurship, which have benefited thousands of students and graduates of schools, vocational institutes and universities. He also contributed to establishing the AZEM self-employment programme for individuals and associations, the Inhad national self-employment programme, and the Tatweer programme for improving the competitiveness of small and medium-sized enterprises, with a focus on the governorates and areas of high poverty.

- Maharat focuses on the personal and professional skills of young job seekers. According to the centre, it is taught as an accredited elective course at seven Jordanian universities, was implemented in the United Arab Emirates and Oman after Boeing selected the centre to deliver it, and was recognised as a best practice by the Union for the Mediterranean.
- Sanad targets technical and vocational students and, according to the centre, was implemented in 44 vocational schools, 6 academic schools and 12 community colleges.
- Inhad is a national self-employment programme launched in line with directives from King Abdullah II. It targets Jordanians aged 18 to 45 and prepares them for concessional loans of 5,000 to 50,000 dinars to start businesses, in partnership with the Central Bank of Jordan and the Association of Banks in Jordan. The centre has implemented it across Jordan's governorates since 2020 with support from UNICEF.

According to the centre, its programmes have trained more than 163,000 people, more than 29,000 of whom found employment, and have contributed to the creation of more than 4,100 businesses.

=== Minister of Labour ===
Steitieh was appointed Minister of Labour by royal decree on 11 October 2021, in the fourth reshuffle of the Khasawneh government. At the time of his appointment he was chief executive of the Business Development Center and chairman of the Jordanian Canadian Business Association. Shortly after his appointment, a television interview in which he said that two companies he had founded had failed circulated on social media and drew criticism.

As minister, he discussed co-operation on labour issues with the Canadian ambassador to Jordan, with a focus on the Vocational Training Corporation and the Technical and Vocational Skills Development Commission.

He left office in the cabinet reshuffle of 27 October 2022, when his resignation was accepted along with those of ten other ministers, and the labour portfolio returned to Yousef Shamali alongside the Ministry of Industry, Trade and Supply.

=== Later roles ===
Steitieh chairs the German-Jordanian Vocational Education and Training Council, the Trans Jordan Trading Company, the Mitsubishi vehicle distributor in Jordan, and the Jordanian Canadian Business Association (JOCABA).

== Memberships ==
Steitieh was the first Jordanian member of the business expert council of the OECD, and represented the Mediterranean countries on the expert council on employment and entrepreneurship strategies of the Union for the Mediterranean in Barcelona. He has served as a member of:

- the Higher Education Council;
- the Investment Promotion Council;
- the National Committee for Human Resources Development;
- the National Employment Programme committee;
- the national committee that drafted the 2020–2025 national tourism strategy, and the tourism sites management committee;
- the boards of the School of Business at the University of Jordan, the Jordan University of Science and Technology, and the Queen Rania Center for Jordanian Studies and Community Service at Yarmouk University.

== Honours ==
- Order of King Abdullah II for Excellence, second class (2018). King Abdullah II conferred the order at the national celebration of the 72nd Independence Day at Al-Husseiniya Palace on 24 May 2018, in recognition of his founding and management of the Business Development Center, the centre's work in preparing young people in the governorates for the labour market and promoting entrepreneurship, and his founding of the Maharat and Sanad programmes.
- First place in leadership, Global Leadership Award, Thunderbird School of Global Management, Arizona.
