= Muhannad Al Mubaidin =

Jordanian academic and politician

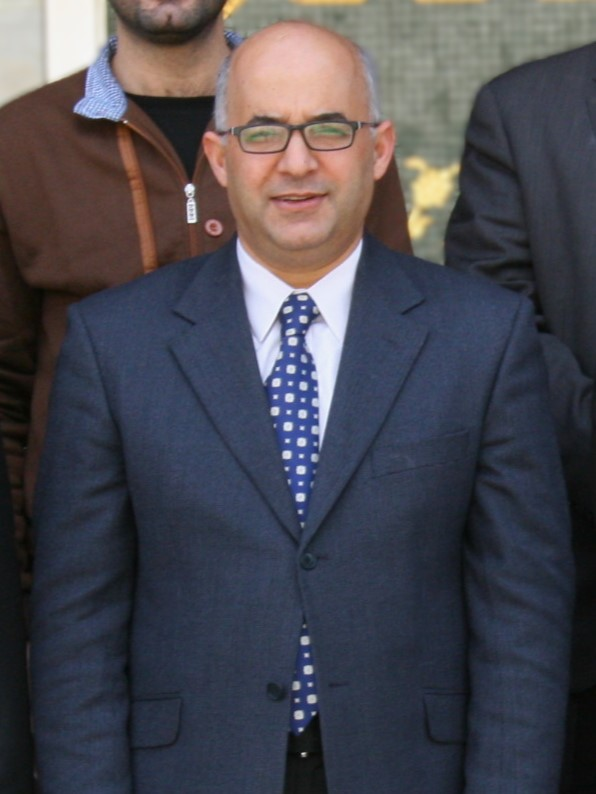
- Muhannad Al Mubaidin at the University of Jordan, 2015.

Minister of Government Communications
- Incumbent
- Assumed office 27 September 2023
- Monarch: Abdullah II of Jordan
- Prime Minister: Bisher Al-Khasawneh
- Preceded by: Faisal Shboul

Personal details
- Born: 1973 (age 52–53) Karak, Jordan
- Education: Bachelor’s degree in History and Archaeology, Mutah University (1995); Master’s degree in Modern Islamic History, Al al-Bayt University (1999); Doctorate in Modern Arab History, University of Jordan (2003)

Muhannad Al Mubaidin is a Jordanian politician currently serving as the Minister of Government Communications.

== Early life and education ==
Born in 1973 in Karak, a city in southern Jordan, he spent his childhood in the village of Al-Thaniyah. His early education took place in the local school, before transitioning to a school in the Al-Marj area in the late 1980s. He completed his secondary education at Prince Hassan School in 1991, under the administration of Muhammad Uqla Al-Rawashdeh.

He pursued higher education at Mutah University, earning a Bachelor’s degree in History and Archaeology in 1995. Further studies were undertaken at Al al-Bayt University in Mafraq, Jordan, where he achieved a Master’s degree in Modern Islamic History with distinction in 1999. He then went on to obtain a Doctorate in Modern Arab History from the University of Jordan in 2003.

== Career ==
In a recent cabinet reshuffle by Prime Minister Bisher Khasawneh, Mubaidin has taken on the role of Minister of Government Communications. His contributions have been pivotal in disseminating the strategies and initiatives of various ministries and public bodies to the media and the general public. He has suggested the creation of a dedicated public communication unit within all public institutions and ministries.

Muhannad Al Mubaidin has reiterated the Kingdom's steadfast stance on the conflict in the Gaza Strip involving Israel. His efforts have been focused on diplomatic and humanitarian actions to assist the Gaza Strip and the occupied West Bank. He has emphasized Jordan's efforts, under Royal directives, which include sending food aid and medical assistance to the besieged strip. During King Abdullah's European tour, he has also been successful in shaping the Western narrative about the conflict in Gaza.
