= Nadia al Rawabdeh =

Jordanian politician (born 1963)

Nadia Al-Rawabdeh
- ناديا الروابدة

Minister of Labour
- Incumbent
- Assumed office 27 September 2023
- Monarch: Abdullah II of Jordan
- Prime Minister: Bisher Al-Khasawneh
- Preceded by: Nayef Steitieh

Personal details
- Born: December 4, 1963 (age 62)
- Education: Bachelor's degree in Political Science and Sociology (1984)
- Alma mater: University of Jordan

Nadia Abdul Rauf Salim Al-Rawabdeh (born 4 December 1963) is a Jordanian politician currently serving as the Minister of Labour since 27 September 2023.

== Early life and education ==
Al-Rawabdeh was born on 4 December 1963. She received her bachelor's degree in Political Science and Sociology from the University of Jordan in 1984.

== Career ==
Throughout her professional journey, Al-Rawabdeh has occupied numerous roles. From September 2012 until April 2018, she was at the helm of the Social Security Corporation as its General Manager. Concurrently, she held the position of Vice Chairman on the Board of Directors for the same organization.

Al-Rawabdeh's board memberships span across a variety of organizations. These include the Social Security Investment Fund, Kingdom Electricity Company, Al Asr Company, and Jordan Ceramic Company. She also served on the boards of National Tourism Co. For Tourism Development, Daman for Investment Company, Al Daman for Development Zones Company, and The Jordan Worsted Mills Company.

Moreover, Nadia Abdul Rauf Salim Al-Rawabdeh held the position of Chairman at Yarmouk Water Company from 2019 to 2020. At present, she presides over Kingdom Electricity Co. PSC and Wadia Araba Development Company as their Chairman. She also contributes as a member of the Board of Trustees for the Jordanian Expatriate Award and the Economic Policy Development Forum.

Currently, Al-Rawabdeh is serving as the Minister of Labour, a position she has held since 27 September 2023. Her involvement in national affairs extends to her membership in several national committees. These include the National Committee for Poverty and Unemployment Strategy, the National Committee for Special Needs Strategy, and the National Committee to Follow-up on the Implementation of the Executive Plan for the National Family Strategy.
