= Kholoud Saqqaf =

Jordanian politician

Kholoud Al-Saqqaf

Minister of Investment
- In office 27 October 2022 – 15 September 2024
- Monarch: Abdullah II of Jordan
- Prime Minister: Bisher Al-Khasawneh
- Preceded by: Khairy Amr
- Succeeded by: Mothanna Gharaibeh

Personal details
- Education: University of Jordan (MSc)

Kholoud Al-Saqqaf is a Jordanian politician. Previously, she had served as Minister of Investment from 27 October 2022 until 15 September 2024.

== Education ==
Saqqaf holds a Bachelor of Economics and Accounting (1984) and a Master of Economics and Statistics (1993) from the University of Jordan.
