= Haifa Najjar =

Jordanian politician

Her Excellency Haifa Najjar
- هيفاء النجار

Minister of Culture
- Incumbent
- Assumed office 11 October 2021
- Monarch: Abdullah II of Jordan
- Prime Minister: Bisher Al-Khasawneh
- Preceded by: Basim Tweissi

Personal details
- Born: Haifa Yousef Fadel Najjar; 1959 (age 66–67) Zarqa
- Education: University of Jordan (B); University of Buckingham (M)

Haifa Yousef Fadel Najjar (born 1959) is the Jordanian Minister of Culture. She was appointed as minister on 11 October 2021.

== Education ==
Najjar completed a degree in population studies at the University of Jordan before attaining a master's degree in transformational management at the University of Buckingham. She was a founding member of the Board of Trustees of The King's Academy and a board member of the Greater Amman Municipality. Najjar worked at the Ahliyyah School for Girls from 1984, and was Principal at both Ahliyyah and the Bishop's School for Girls since 2008.

== Honours ==
Najjar was awarded the Al-Hussein Humanitarian Leadership Prize (2001), the El-Hassan Bin Talal Award for Academic Excellence (2002), and the European Council of International Schools (ECIS) Award for the Promotion of International Education (2009). She received the Lanfranc Award for Education and Scholarship from Justin Welby, Archbishop of Canterbury, in 2017 "for her outstanding contribution to education in Jordan and her exemplary leading role in Jordanian society as a Christian woman."

She received the Order of Civil Merit from the King of Spain in June 2017 and the Legion of Honour in September 2018.
