= Khaled Musa Al Henefat =

Jordanian politician (born 1972)

- خالد الحنيفات

Minister of Agriculture
- Incumbent
- Assumed office 10 March 2021
- Monarch: Abdullah II of Jordan
- Prime Minister: Bisher Al-Khasawneh
- Preceded by: Mohammad Daoudiyeh

Minister of Agriculture
- In office 1 October 2016 – 2018
- Monarch: Abdullah II of Jordan
- Prime Minister: Hani Mulki
- Succeeded by: Mohammad Daoudiyeh

Personal details
- Born: 7 July 1972 (age 54)
- Education: Al-Balqaʼ Applied University (B)

Khaled Musa Al Henefat (born 7 July 1972) is the Jordanian Minister of Agriculture. He was appointed as minister on 10 March 2021.

== Education ==
Henefat holds a Bachelor in Mechanical Engineering (1995) from Al-Balqaʼ Applied University.

== Career ==
From 1995 until 1996, he was a trainee at the Ministry of Public Works and Housing. Between 1998 and 2007, Henefat established an international contracting company and shops for construction materials. From 2015 until 2016, he served as Mayor of Tafilah. Between 1 October 2016 and 2018 he had worked as Minister of Agriculture.

Since 10 March 2021, he has served again as Minister of Agriculture.
