= Ministry of Health (Jordan) =

Government ministry of Jordan

- وزارة الصحة

Agency overview
- Formed: 1950
- Jurisdiction: Government of Jordan
- Headquarters: 31.983841°N 35.940474°E
- Minister responsible: Dr. Ibrahim Al-Bdour
- Website: www.moh.gov.jo/Default/En

The Ministry of Health in Jordan (Arabic: وزارة الصحة) is a governmental body responsible for the public health system, healthcare services, and medical policies in the Kingdom of Jordan. It works toward the health and well-being of Jordan's population through the regulation and provision of healthcare services, disease prevention, and various health promotion initiatives. The Ministry of Health in Jordan was established on Dec 14, 1950, following the formation of the Kingdom of Jordan in 1946.

The Ministry of Health is located in al-Hashmi al-Shamali, Basman area, in Amman.

== History and Development ==
Jordan has seen significant growth in its health sector over the past forty years, achieving major advancements across various medical fields despite challenges arising from the Palestinian tragedies (Nakba) of 1948 and 1967 war. The real development boom occurred post-independence and the unification of the two banks of Jordan. The key milestones in the Ministry of Health's development include:

- 1950: Establishment of the Ministry of Health on December 14.
- 1951: Beginning of health development initiatives.
- 1953: Opening of the first nursing college and the Central Laboratory for Medical Tests.
- 1954: Establishment of the Doctors Union.
- 1962: Opening of Princess Muna College of Nursing.
- 1963: Introduction of health insurance for the Jordanian Armed Forces.
- 1965: Implementation of the first civil health insurance.
- 1970: Establishment of the College of Medicine at the University of Jordan.
- 1971: Issuance of General Health Law No. 21.
- 1973: Opening of Al Hussein Medical Center and the allied medical professions institute in Amman.
- 1978: Opening of another allied medical professions institute in Irbid.
- 1980: Opening of the College of Pharmacy at the University of Jordan.

== Responsibilities and Functions ==
The Ministry of Health in Jordan is responsible for maintaining public health through preventive, treatment, and health control services. It organizes and supervises health services offered by both public and private sectors, and provides health insurance to the public within available resources. Additionally, the Ministry establishes and manages health educational and training institutes and centers, ensuring they operate according to relevant legislation. These functions are central to the Ministry's role in promoting and protecting the health and well-being of Jordan's population.
