= Barcelona Convention =

1976 multilateral treaty

The Barcelona Convention for the Protection of the Marine Environment and the Coastal Region of the Mediterranean (1995)
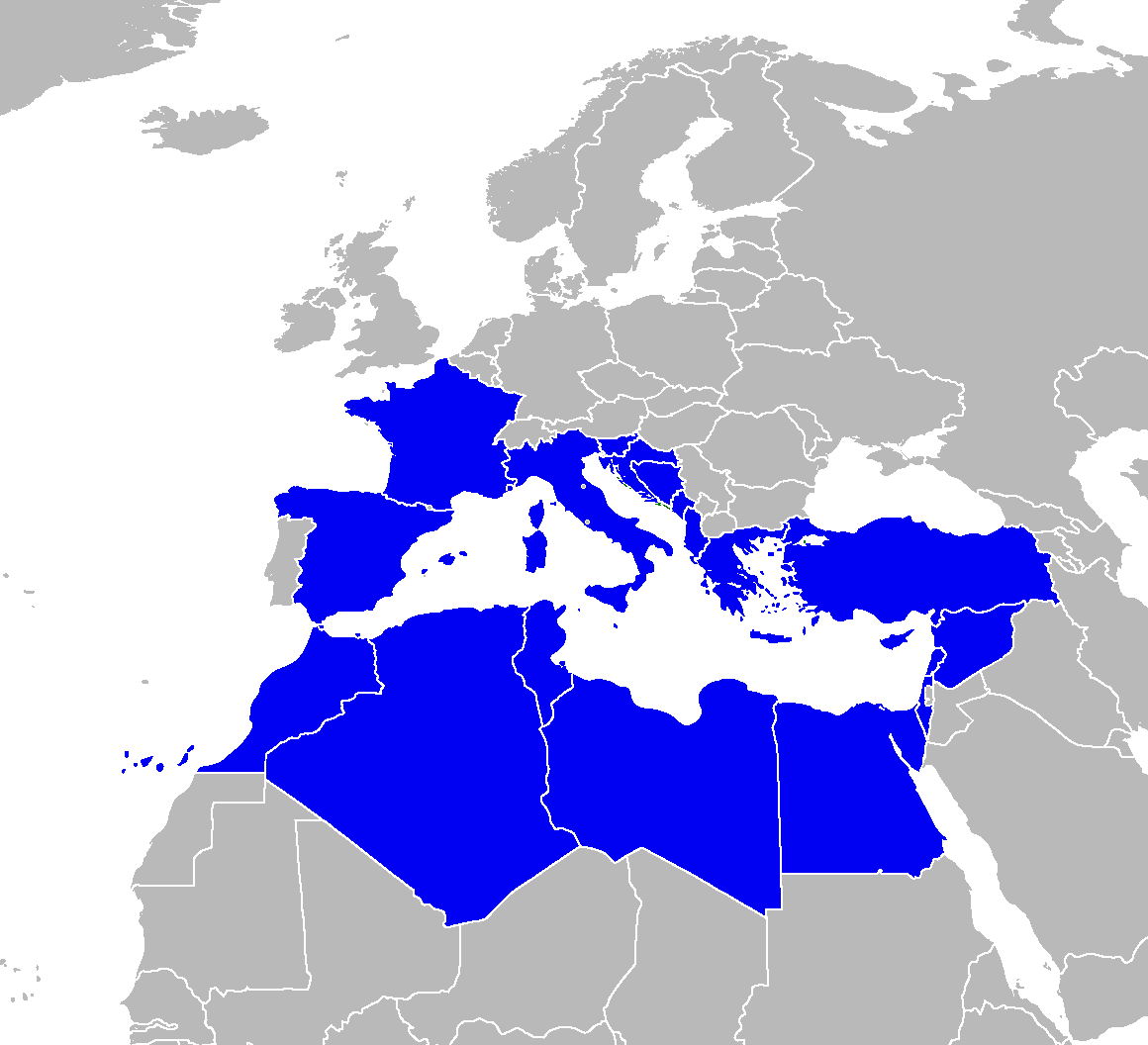
- Map showing the parties to the Convention
- Signed: 1975 (original form); 1995 (amendments)
- Location: Barcelona, Spain
- Effective: Original 16 February 1976, Amendments 9 July 2004
- Parties: 22 Contracting Parties: Albania; Algeria; Bosnia and Herzegovina (Amendments not in force); Croatia; Cyprus; Egypt; European Union; France; Greece; Israel; Italy; Lebanon; Libya; Malta; Monaco; Montenegro; Morocco; Slovenia; Spain; Syria; Tunisia; Turkey
- Depositary: United Nations

The Convention for the Protection of the Marine Environment and the Coastal Region of the Mediterranean, originally the Convention for Protection of the Mediterranean Sea against Pollution, and often simply referred to as the Barcelona Convention, is a regional convention adopted in 1976 to prevent and abate pollution from ships, aircraft and land based sources in the Mediterranean Sea. This includes but is not limited to dumping, run-off and discharges. Signers agreed to cooperate and assist in dealing with pollution emergencies, monitoring and scientific research. The convention was adopted on 16 February 1976 and amended on 10 June 1995.

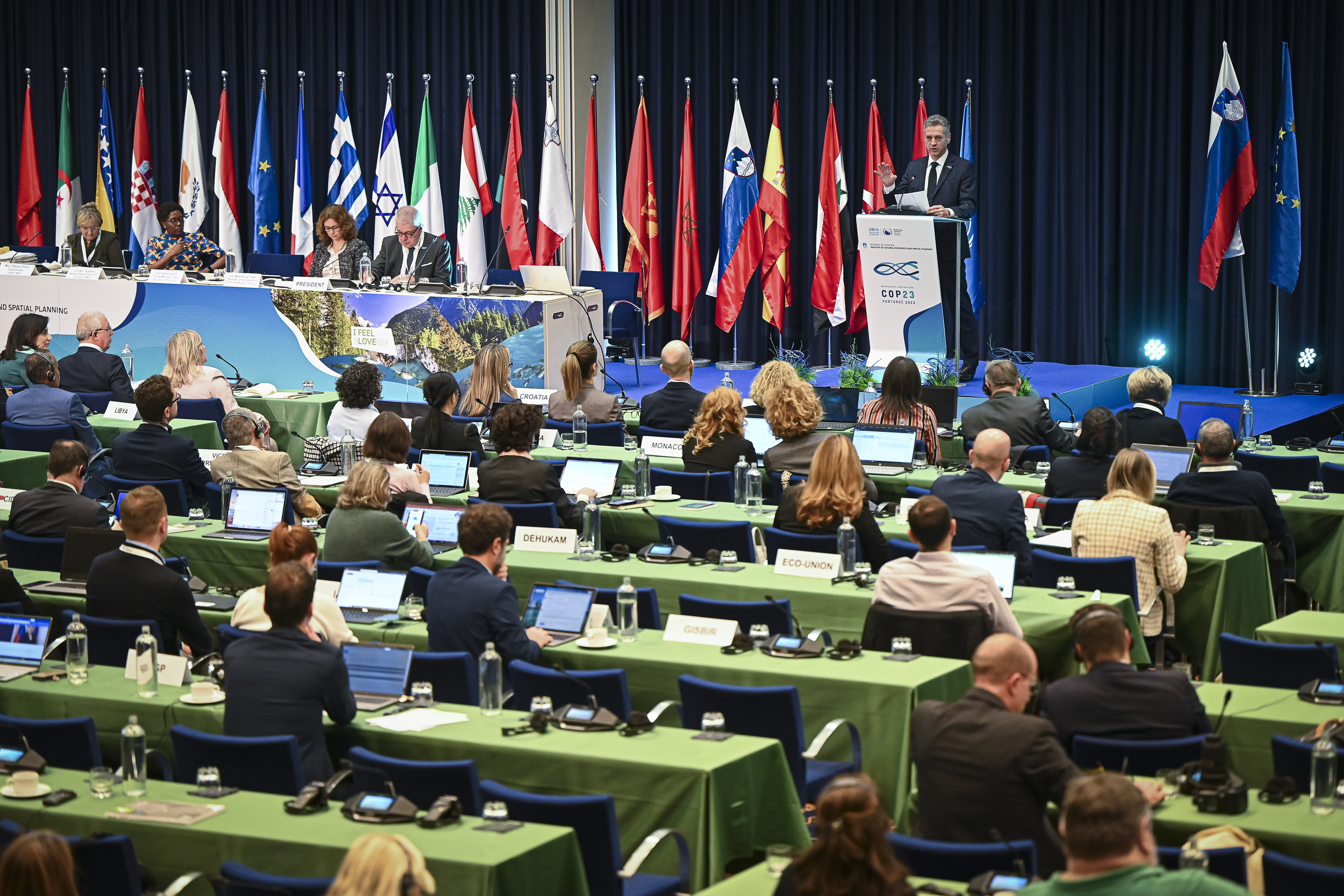
23rd Meeting of the Contracting Parties to the Barcelona Convention in Portorož

The Barcelona Convention and its protocols form the legal framework of the Mediterranean Action Plan (approved in 1975), developed under the United Nations Environment Programme (UNEP) Regional Seas Programme.

== Goals ==
The key goal of the convention is to "reduce pollution in the Mediterranean Sea and protect and improve the marine environment in the area, thereby contributing to its sustainable development". To achieve this a number of aims and commitments have been established.

=== Aims ===
- To prevent, reduce, combat and, as far as possible, eliminate pollution in the Zone of the Mediterranean Sea.
- To attain the objective of sustainable development, taking fully into account the recommendations of the Mediterranean Commission on Sustainable Development (MCSD), the advisory body established under Article 4 of the Convention.
- To protect the environment and to contribute to sustainable development:
  - By applying the precautionary principle and that the polluter should pay
  - By performing Environmental Impact Assessments (EIA)
  - By promoting cooperation between coastal States in EIA procedures.
- To promote the integrated management of coastal zones, taking into account the protection of zones of ecological and landscape interest and the rational use of natural resources. To apply the Convention and its Protocols:
  - By adopting programmes and measures with defined deadlines for completion.
  - By using the best techniques available and the best environmental practices.
- To formulate and adopt Protocols that prescribe agreed measures, procedures and regulations to apply the convention.
- To promote, within the relevant international bodies, measures relating to the application of sustainable development programmes and environmental protection, conservation and rehabilitation and the natural resources of the Mediterranean Sea.

=== Commitments ===
Members agreed to take specific measures:

- against pollution due to dumping from ships and air planes
- against pollution due to discharges from ships,
- against pollution caused by prospection for, and exploitation of, the continental shelf, the seabed and its subsoil,
- against land-based pollution,
- to cooperate in pollution incidents giving rise to situations of emergency,
- to protect biological diversity,
- against pollution due to transboundary movements of dangerous wastes and to eliminate them,
- to monitor pollution,
- to cooperate in science and technology
- to apply environmental legislation, and
- to facilitate public access to information and public participation.

== Status ==
Originally, fourteen states and the European Communities signed the Convention adopted in 1976. It came into effect on 12 February 1978. The amendments adopted in 1995 have yet to be ratified by Bosnia and Herzegovina. Parties are all countries with a Mediterranean shoreline as well as the European Union. NGOs with a stated interest and third-party governments are allowed observer status.

The convention is applicable to the 'Zone of the Mediterranean Sea'. This is defined as 'the maritime waters of the Mediterranean as such, with all its gulfs and tributary seas, bounded to the west by the Strait of Gibraltar and to the east by the Dardanelle Strait'. Parties are allowed to extend the application of the convention to the coastal areas within their own territory.

== See also ==
- Mediterranean Sea
- Law of the sea
- Specially Protected Areas of Mediterranean Importance
- Protected areas
- London Convention
