= Raed Adwan =

Jordanian politician

Raed Sami Affash Al-Adwan
- رائد العدوان

Minister of Youth
- Incumbent
- Assumed office 6 August 2025
- Monarch: Abdullah II of Jordan
- Prime Minister: Jafar Hassan
- Preceded by: Yazan Shdeifat

Personal details
- Education: PhD in Law

Raed Sami Affash Al-Edwan is the Jordanian Minister of Youth. He was appointed as minister on 6 August 2025.

== Education ==
Adwan holds a PhD in Law.
