= Wesam Al Tahtamouni =

Jordanian politician

- وسام التهتموني

Minister of Transport
- In office 27 September 2023 – 6 August 2025
- Monarch: Abdullah II of Jordan
- Prime Minister: Bisher Al-Khasawneh
- Succeeded by: Nidal Katamine

General Secretary of the Ministry of Transport
- In office 26 August 2019 – 26 September 2023
- Monarch: Abdullah II of Jordan
- Prime Minister: Bisher Al-Khasawneh

Wesam Al Tahtamouni is a Jordanian politician. He had served as Minister of Transport from 27 September 2023 until 6 August 2025. Appointed during a cabinet reshuffle by Prime Minister Bisher Khasawneh, Al Tahtamouni has been contributing to the Ministry of Transport since August 26, 2019, initially as the General Secretary.

== Career ==
Wesam Al Tahtamouni has been serving in key roles within the Ministry of Transport. She first took on the role of General Secretary of the Ministry of Transport on August 26, 2019. On 27 September 2023, she was appointed as the Minister of Transport during the cabinet reshuffle under Prime Minister Bisher Khasawneh.
