= Wafaa Bani Mustafa =

Jordanian politician (born 1979)

- وفاء بني مصطفى

Minister of Social Development
- Incumbent
- Assumed office 27 October 2022
- Monarch: Abdullah II of Jordan
- Prime Minister: Bisher Al-Khasawneh
- Preceded by: Ayman Riad Saeid Almuflih

Minister of State for Legal Affairs
- In office 11 October 2021 – 27 October 2022
- Prime Minister: Bisher Al-Khasawneh
- Preceded by: Mahmoud Kharabsheh
- Succeeded by: Nancy Namrouqa

Personal details
- Born: 1979 (age 46–47)

Wafaa Saed Bani Mustafa (born 1979) is the Jordanian Minister of Social Development. She was appointed as minister on 27 October 2022. Previously she had served as Minister of State for Legal Affairs from 11 October 2021 until 27 October 2022.

== Education ==
Mustafa holds a Master of Laws.

== Career ==
Bani Mustafa worked as a lawyer until she was elected member of parliament in 2010 and served three terms until 2020.

On 11 October 2021, she was appointed Minister of State for Legal Affairs, succeeding Mahmoud Kharabsheh.

Since 27 October 2022, Bani Mustafa has been Minister of Social Development.
