= Haditha Jamal Haditha Al-Khreisha =

Jordanian politician (born 1973)

Haditha Jamal Haditha Al-Kharisha
- حديثة جمال الخريشة

Minister for Political and Parliamentary Affairs
- Incumbent
- Assumed office 27 September 2023
- Monarch: Abdullah II of Jordan
- Prime Minister: Bisher Al-Khasawneh
- Preceded by: Wajih Azaizeh

Minister of Youth
- In office 2017–2018
- Monarch: Abdullah II of Jordan
- Prime Minister: Hani Mulki
- Preceded by: Rami Wreikat
- Succeeded by: Makram Mustafa Queisi

Personal details
- Born: 1973 (age 52–53)

Haditha Jamal Haditha Al-Kharisha (born 1973) is the Jordanian Minister for Political and Parliamentary Affairs. He was appointed as minister on 27 September 2023.

== Education ==
Al-Kharisha holds a bachelor's degree in Civil Engineering.

== Career ==
Between 2017 and 2018, Al-Khreisha had served as Minister of Youth.
