= Zeina Toukan =

Jordanian politician

- زينة طوقان
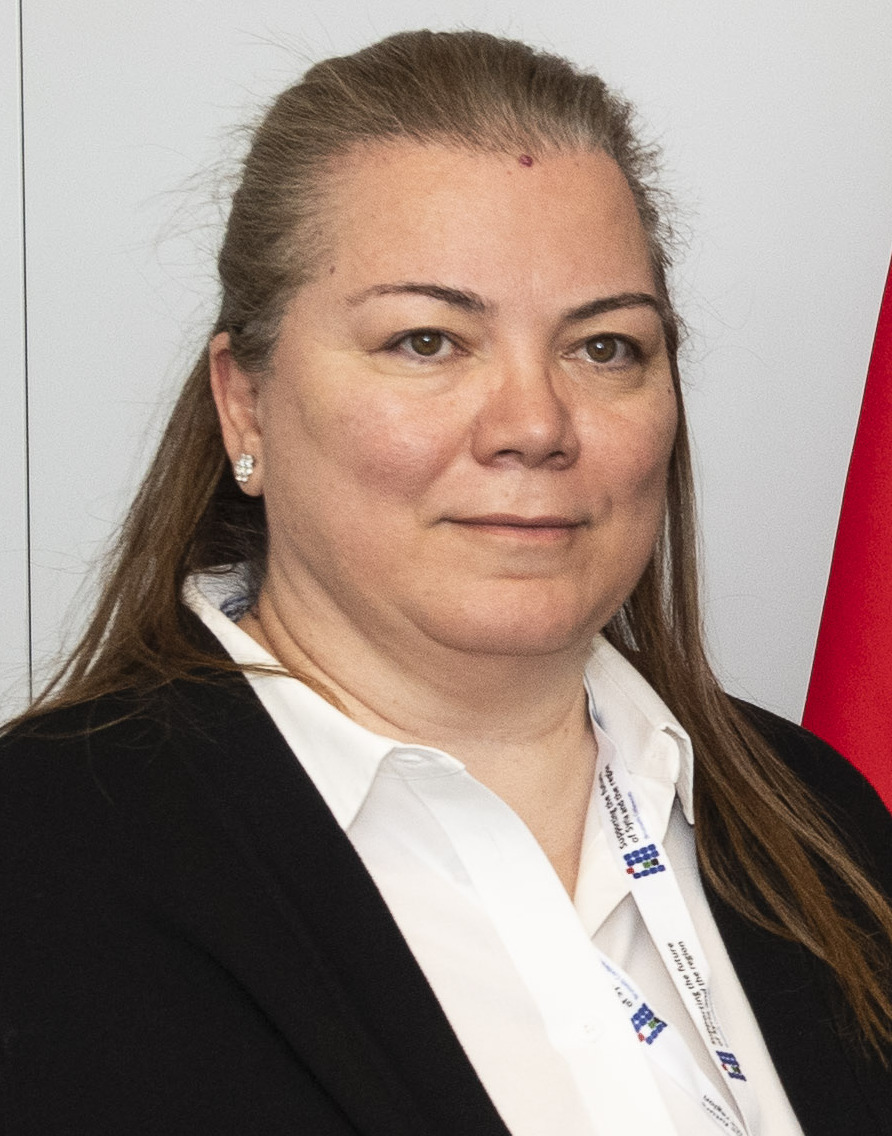
- Toukan in 2023

Minister of Planning and International Cooperation
- Incumbent
- Assumed office 27 October 2022
- Monarch: Abdullah II of Jordan
- Prime Minister: Bisher Al-Khasawneh
- Preceded by: Nasser Shraideh

Personal details
- Education: American University in Cairo (BS); SOAS University of London (MSc)

Zeina Toukan is the Jordanian Minister of Planning and International Cooperation. She was appointed as minister on 27 October 2022.

== Education ==
Toukan holds a Bachelor of Economics from the American University in Cairo and a Master of Development Economics from the SOAS University of London.

== Career ==
In 2007, Toukan was the Director of International Cooperation at the Ministry of Planning. In 2008, she was Project Manager at the EU Programme Management Office. From 2017 to 2020, Toukan served as Secretary General of the Ministry of Planning and International Cooperation.

From August until October 2022, she worked as Advisor of Economic Affairs and Director of Economic Policies Directorate at King Abdullah II Office.
