= SafeMed II Project =

The SafeMed Project on maritime safety and prevention of pollution from ships is a European Union (EU) funded regional project run by the Regional Marine Pollution Emergency Response Centre for the Mediterranean Sea (REMPEC) on behalf of the International Maritime Organization (IMO).

Currently in its second phase of operation, the SafeMed II Project (2009–2011) builds on the achievements of SafeMed I (2006–2009).

== Goals ==
The aim of the SafeMed II Project is to develop cooperation in the fields of maritime safety and security and in the protection of the marine environment between the EU and the Mediterranean partners. Its main objectives are:

- To procure a sustainable improvement in the protection of Mediterranean waters against the risks of accidents at sea and marine pollution;
- To further reduce the capacity gap between the application of international regulatory framework and the EU legislative framework in order to ensure a coherent, effective and uniform implementation of the international conventions and rules for maritime safety and security.

== Activities ==
The SafeMed II Project assists the Mediterranean partner Beneficiaries with the further implementation of the 2007 adopted Regional Transport Action Plan (RTAP) for the Mediterranean 2007-2013. The Project offers training programmes and assistance, promotes a common platform for best practices to regulate maritime traffic in the Mediterranean, and seeks to achieve improved access to information for all.

The Project funds scholarships to internationally recognized maritime universities (such as the World Maritime University), organises seminars and workshops and publishes its own quarterly newsletter, the SafeMed Beacon.

== See also ==
- SafeMed II Technical Annex Summary
