= Royal Hashemite Court =

Jordanian monarchial institution

History
- Founded: 11 April 1919

Leadership
- Head: Yousef Al-Eisawi

Website
- rhc.jo

The Royal Hashemite Court (RHC) (Arabic: ٱلدِّيوَانُ ٱلْمَلَكِيُّ ٱلْهَاشِمِيُّ, Al-Diwan Al-Malaki Al-Hāshimy), which is historically known as Al-Maqar (Arabic: ٱلْمَقَرُّ, lit. 'the Headquarters'), is the administrative and political link between the King of Jordan and the Jordanian state which includes constitutional authorities (governmental, legislative and judicial), the Armed Forces and the Security Services. It also acts as the primary body responsible for supervising the relationship between the King and the Jordanian people.

Established in 1946, at the time of the independence of the Hashemite Kingdom of Jordan, the RHC is the official institution that oversees the preparation and implementation of the King's local and international activities, while providing the necessary political, administrative and diplomatic support to the state in order to enable them to fulfil the tasks entrusted to them by the constitution.

== Senior officers ==
- Yousef Aleisawi
- Bisher Khasawneh
