= Amman Arab University =

Private university in Amman, Jordan

- جامعة عمان العربية
- Former name: Amman Arab University for Graduate Studies (1999–2009)
- Type: Private
- Established: 1997/11/24 (27 years ago)
- Affiliations: IAU, FUIW, AArU
- President: Muhammad Al-Widyan
- Students: ~3489 (2020/2021)
- Postgraduates: 13799
- Location: Jordan St. Mobus, Amman, Jordan
- Campus: 20000 square meters
- Colors: Orange White and Blue
- Nickname: AAU
- Website: www.aau.edu.jo
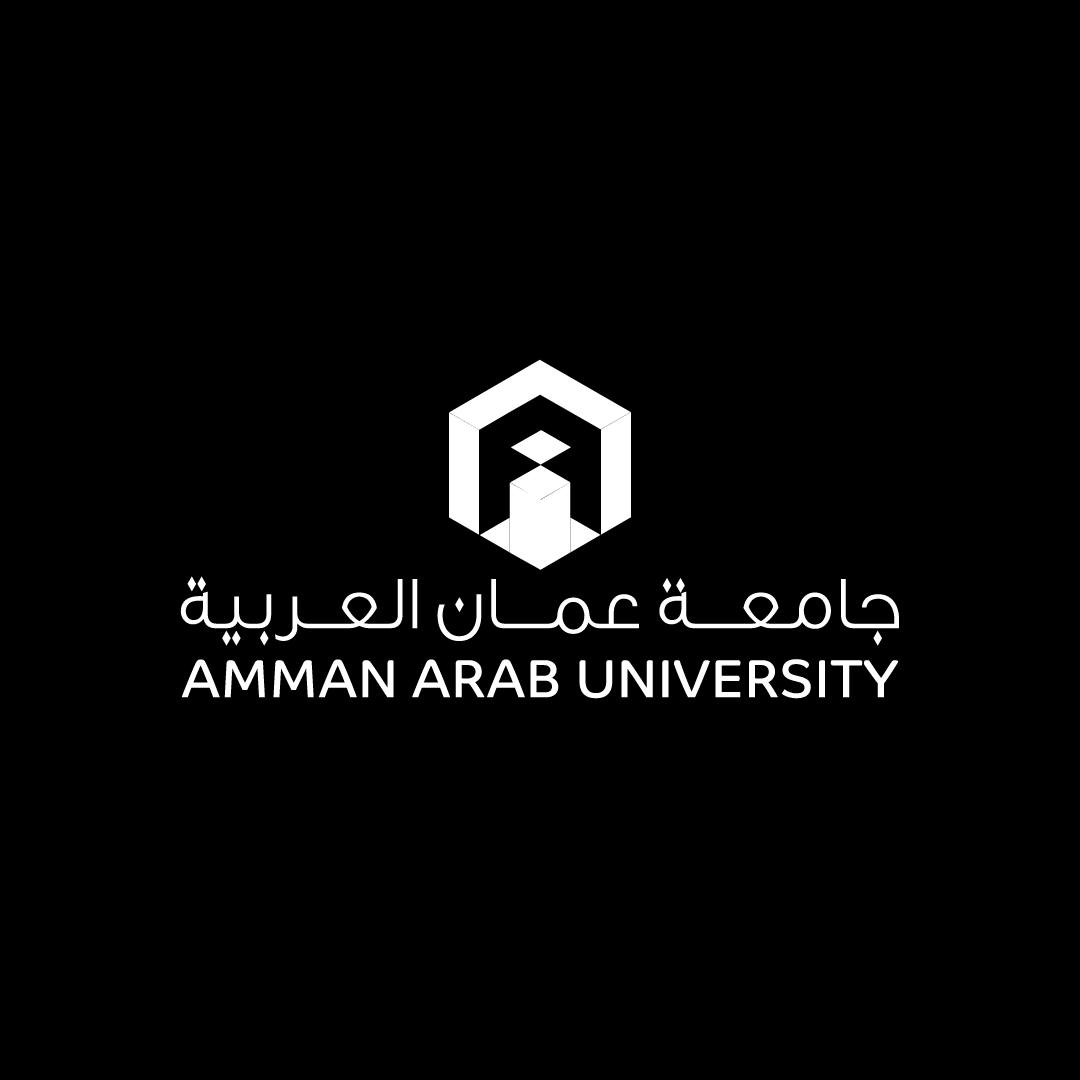

Amman Arab University (Arabic: جامعة عمان العربية), abbreviated AAU, is a private university in Amman, Jordan. It was established in 1997 as a non-profit private university for graduate studies. AAU was the first Jordanian university to specialize in postgraduate programs for masters and doctoral studies. On 30 September 1998, the university received a permit from Higher Education Council. The first group of students began studying there in 1999/2000. Initially the university offered only graduate programs but it began to accept undergraduates in 2009. That year its name was changed to Amman Arab University.

The University is composed of nine faculties and contains over 25 departments. It is a publicly and privately accredited university and a member of the Association of Arab Universities, International Association of Universities, and League of Islamic Universities.

== Colleges ==
=== College of Aviation Science ===
- Department of Aircraft Maintenance Engineering
- Department of Avionics Engineering

=== College of Education and Psychological Sciences ===
- Department of Educational Fundamentals and Administration
- Department of Psychology
- Department of Counseling and Special Education
- Department of Curriculum and Teaching Methods
- Department of Special Education

=== College of Information Technology ===
- Department of Computer Science
- Department of Data Science & Artificial Intelligence
- Department of Cyber Security
- Department of Software Engineering

=== College of Business ===
- Department of Accounting
- Department of Finance and Banking
- Department of Business Administration
- Department of Management Information Systems
- Department of Digital Marketing

=== College of Law ===
- Department of Public Law
- Department of Private Law

=== College of Pharmacy ===
- Department of Pharmacy

=== College of Engineering ===
- Department of Civil Engineering
- Department of Architecture
- Department of Renewable Energy Engineering

=== College of Arts and Sciences ===
- English department
- Mathematics department
- Department of Applied Linguistics

=== College of Sharia ===
- Department of Sharia and Islamic studies

=== College of Applied Medical Sciences ===
- Department of Medical Laboratory Sciences

== University Centers ==
=== Information and Communications Technology Center ===
The Information and Communications Technology Center was established at Amman Arab University by the decision of the President of the University since its founding in 1999, with the aim of using computer and information technology for university students, members of its teaching and administrative bodies, and the local community. The center works on computerizing business and administrative procedures in colleges, deanships, and university departments, preparing training programs in the areas of using computer and information technology, and providing these departments with the necessary technical support and programs. The center also holds technical courses for university employees, and the center aims to provide all the necessary services and infrastructure in the field of computer and information technology at the university and work to develop them continuously.

=== Languages and Translation Center ===
The Language Center was established at Amman Arab University in 2001. The Language Center is one of the university's units that is academically linked to the College of Arts and Sciences, which serves students of various specializations at the university. The center teaches the university's requirements in the English language to improve students’ performance in the English language and provide them with in addition, the center works on holding courses in various English language skills, such as: comprehensive English language courses, conversation courses, translation courses, and qualifying courses that help students pass the national TOEFL exam. This is to serve university students and members of the local community. The center also teaches the university's requirements in the Arabic language through levels, where the student registered at the university is subject to a level exam through which he determines the courses he must study during his university career.

=== Consulting and training center ===
The Center for Consultations, Studies and Training was established in accordance with the decision of the Council of Deans at Amman Arab University, which aims to activate the university's role in qualifying, training and assisting young people in acquiring scientific knowledge, developing the necessary skills for them, and contributing to supporting public and private institutions by raising the efficiency of their employees. Providing and improving the knowledge supply in a comprehensive manner, empowering Jordanian and Arab human resources, and advancing talents and ideas to improve the outcomes of the learning process in a way that is compatible with the requirements of the local and international labour market. The center has concluded agreements with several academies and training companies to implement training programs and diplomas such as (airport management, hotel and tourist facility management, film and television editing, hybrid car maintenance) and many administrative courses to develop employee performance inside and outside the university.

=== Medical Center ===
The Medical Center was established after the founding of the university in 1999. It provides medical services and primary health care to students and workers by conducting clinical examinations of patients, dispensing treatment to them, and providing first aid for emergency cases, including wounds, burns, fractures, etc., as well as checking blood pressure, blood sugar, and ECG. For early detection of heart disease and diabetes, these services are provided under the supervision of a health team and distinguished medical staff, to provide the necessary health care.

The university treats students and provides the necessary medicine, whether inside the university in the medical center for emergency cases, or outside the university in hospitals approved by the insurance company.

=== E-Learning Center ===
The E-Learning Center continuously seeks to develop the teaching and learning process at Amman Arab University through:

- Moving to a distinct interactive educational environment to contribute to achieving the best educational outcomes.
- Training and assisting faculty members practically and technically in designing, developing and implementing electronic content for courses taught at the university.
- Developing communication skills and creative and critical thinking for students.
- Controlling the quality of work and product in the field of e-learning.

== Rankings ==
According to the 2021 Webometrics Ranking of World Universities, it was the 9th ranked university in Jordan and the number 79 university in the Arab world and 2112 in the world.

In 2024, QS ranked the university the 111–120 in the Arab world.

In 2024, The Times Impact ranked the university the 401-600 in the Globally and 3rd in Jordan.

In 2023, the international Scimago ranking ranks first among Jordanian and regional universities in the international Scimago ranking in the Scientific Research criterion.

== Geographic location ==
The university's location provides a view of the capital, Amman, and the governorates of Jerash and Balqa, through its location on Jordan St. in the Mobus area.

== Name conversion ==
In early 2009, the university opened the door for admission and registration in the bachelor's program and changed the university's name to Amman Arab University. The establishment of a private university comparable to distinguished universities in developed countries was an incentive for the establishment of Amman University so that it can effectively fulfill its mission, carry out its functions, and achieves its goals. This is the main incentive that prompted a group of academics and men of thought, science, professions, and business interested in university education to establish Amman Arab University. The need for universities, higher education institutes, and state institutions and facilities for academically qualified leaders to meet the requirements and challenges of contemporary life was also an important incentive to establish the university. The university has provided the local and Arab community with an effective education, as the number of graduates at all levels reached 7,050 students, taught by faculty members who hold doctoral degrees from local, Arab, and international universities.

== Presidents ==
- Said Al-Tal (2000–2012)
- Amin Mahmoud (2013–2013)
- "Muhammad Subhi" Abu-Salih (2013–2013) (acting president)
- Farid Abu Zina (2013–2014) (acting president)
- Mahmoud Al-Sheyyab (2014–2014)
- "Mohamed Nazieh" Hamdi (2014–2014) (acting president)
- Omar Al-Jarrah (2014–2016)
- Ghassan Kanaan (2016–2017) acting
- Maher Saleem (2017–2020)
- Khaled Al Tarawneh (2020–2020) acting
- Mohammad Al-Widyan (current president)

== Board of Trustees ==
- Dr. Omar Mashhour Al-Jazi (Chairman of Board)
