= Ahmad Maher Abul Samen =

Jordanian politician (born 1957)

- أحمد ماهر أبو السمن

Minister of Public Works and Housing and Minister of Transport
- Incumbent
- Assumed office 27 October 2022
- Monarch: Abdullah II of Jordan
- Prime Minister: Bisher Al-Khasawneh
- Preceded by: Yahya Kisbi

Minister of Municipal Affairs
- In office 2011–2013
- Prime Minister: Marouf Bakhit; Awn Khasawneh; Fayez Tarawneh; Abdullah Ensour

Minister of Water and Irrigation
- In office 2012–2013

Personal details
- Born: 1957 (age 68–69)
- Education: University of Bucharest

Ahmad Maher Tawfeeq Abul Samen (born 1957) is the Jordanian Minister of Public Works and Housing and Minister of Transport. He was appointed as minister on 27 October 2022.

== Education ==
Samen holds a Bachelor of Architecture from the University of Bucharest.

== Career ==
Between 2011 and 2013, Samen served as Minister of Municipal Affairs. In addition, from 2012 to 2013, he was the Minister of Water and Irrigation.

Since 27 October 2022, Samen has been the Minister of Public Works and Housing and Minister of Transport.
