= Jordan Institute of Diplomacy =

Jordan Institute of Diplomacy (JID)
- Founder: Government of Jordan
- Established: 1994
- Focus: Diplomacy
- President: Lina Arafat
- Chair: Nasser Joudeh
- Location: Amman, Jordan
- Website: Official website

The Jordan Institute of Diplomacy (JID) was established in 1994 in response to the need for upgrading diplomatic performance to cope with new developments in diplomacy and in means of communication and data transmission. The JID aims to serve society and develop human resources through training and research in the areas of diplomacy, strategy, and International studies, and to highlight the role of Arab Islamic civilization in developing international relations
