= Ministry of Culture (Jordan) =

Government ministry of Jordan

The Ministry of Culture is primarily responsible for supporting cultural development in Jordan.

The Ministry of Culture was established according to Article 20 of the Constitution. Its statute was issued in 1977 and it was formed from the following departments: The Department of Culture and Arts, the Directorate of Libraries and National Documents, and the Youth Welfare Foundation. Prior to that, the Department of Culture and Arts had been established in 1966 as a framework for sponsoring cultural activity in the Kingdom, in addition to filling the void in the cultural services. The Department was established to provide support to anything related to cultural and artistic affairs in the Kingdom, to cooperate with writers, intellectuals and artists and to support their activities. This department was associated with the Ministry of Culture, Information, Tourism and Antiquities, which had been established at the beginning of the year 1964. In 1988, Qom, the first Ministry of Culture and National Heritage was established with a special system, incorporating the Ministry of Culture and National Heritage Regulation No. 5 of 1988, the Ministry of Culture Law No. 5 of 1990, and also the system Ministerial regulation of the Ministry of Culture No. 15 of 2003.

The current Minister of Culture is Haifa Najjar.
