= Ministry of Industry and Trade and Supply (Jordan) =

Government ministry of Jordan

Jordan Ministry of Industry and Trade and Supply
Agency overview
- Formed: 1952
- Jurisdiction: Government of Jordan
- Headquarters: Amman
- Minister responsible: Yarub Qudah
- Website: Official website

The Ministry of Industry and Trade and Supply is the authority responsible for enhancing the position of the Jordanian product in global markets and the entry of Jordanian industry into new markets, enhancing the competitiveness of Jordanian industries and service sectors, improving their production, organizing and controlling internal and external trade. Furthermore, it regulates the insurance sector and supports the industrial sectors in creativity and innovation as well as passing laws that are attractive for the business environment. The ministry also manages civilian consumer enterprises in Jordan. It fosters the development and strengthening the Jordanian economy in partnership with the private sector to raise the citizen's standard of living in Jordan.

The current minister is Yarub Qudah.

== History ==
The ministry was established in 1952, and was known by various names: The Ministry of Trade, The Ministry of Economy and Trade and The Ministry of National Economy, until it settled on the name, The Ministry of Industry and Trade and in 1975 its name changed to Ministry of Trade and Industry. In 1998 the Ministry of Supply was abolished in Jordan and its responsibilities were transferred to the Ministry of Industry and Trade.
