= Ministry of Environment (Jordan) =

Government ministry of Jordan

The Ministry of Environment is the ministry concerned with protecting the environment and its sustainability, improving the quality of life, preserving natural resources, and contributing to achieving sustainable development. The ministry also seeks to mitigate the negative impacts of environmental changes on people in Jordan, preserve environmental systems and, through awareness and educational programs, raise the level of culture in the field of environmental awareness among citizens.

The Ministry also works to limit and reduce the negative effects of plastic bags on the environment in Jordan and preserve forests and reserves. The Ministry is also responsible for the safe disposal of the different kinds of waste, such as solid waste, electronic waste and others.

In 1980, the environmental affairs became the responsibility of the ministry of municipal affairs. In 2003, the Ministry of Environment, a specialized ministry for environmental affairs, was created. Since its creation the ministry has passed many environmental laws.

The current Minister of Environment is Ayman Suleiman.
