= Jafar Hassan =

Prime Minister of Jordan since 2024

His Excellency Jafar Hassan
- جعفر حسان
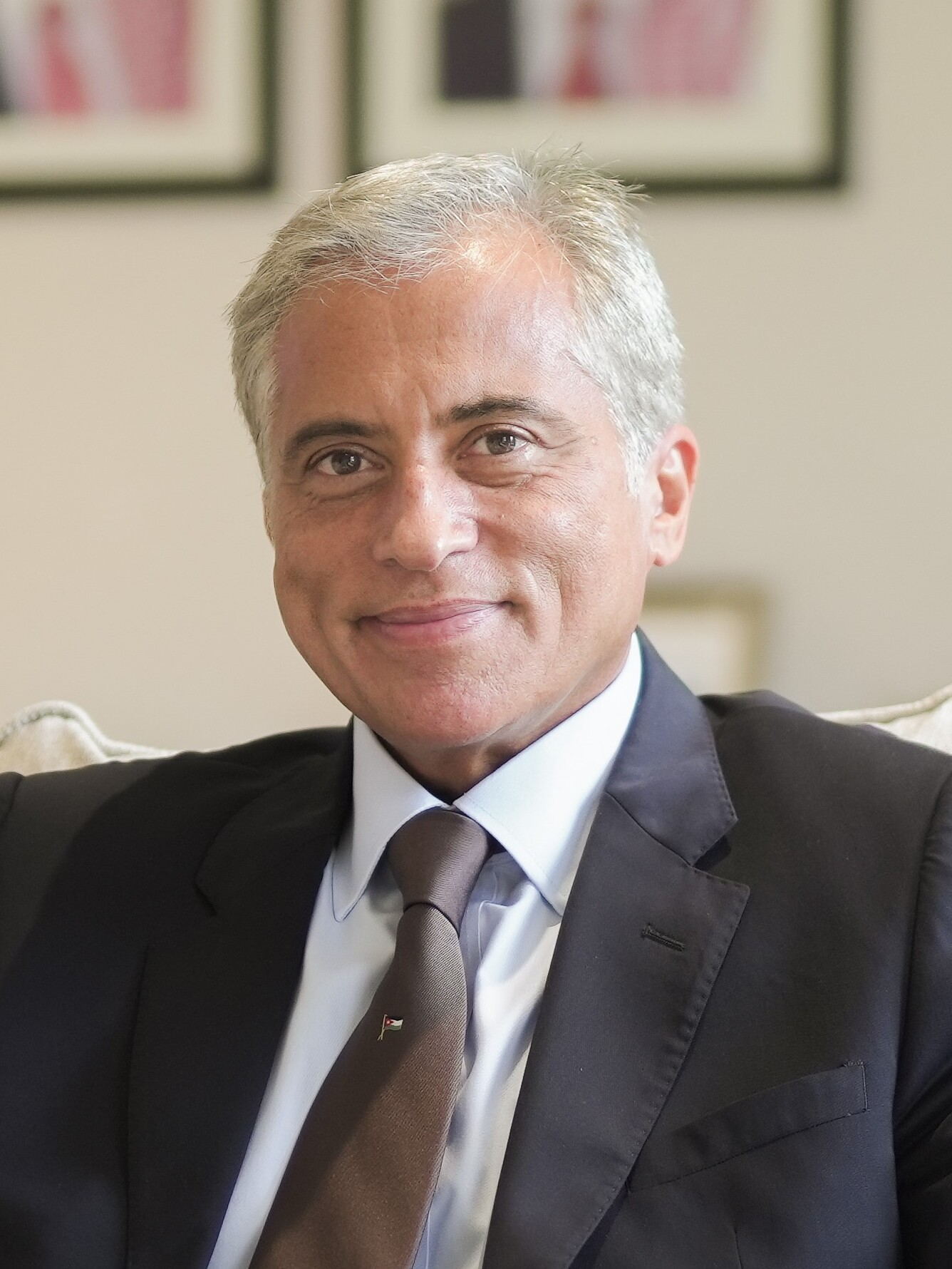
- Official portrait, 2024

Prime Minister of Jordan
- Incumbent
- Assumed office 15 September 2024
- Monarch: Abdullah II
- Preceded by: Bisher Khasawneh

Minister of Planning and International Cooperation
- In office 14 December 2009 – 30 March 2013
- Monarch: Abdullah II
- Prime Minister: Samir Rifai; Marouf al-Bakhit; Awn Al-Khasawneh; Fayez Tarawneh; Abdullah Ensour
- Preceded by: Suhair Al-Ali
- Succeeded by: Ibrahim Saif

Chief of Staff to the King
- In office 2021 – 15 September 2024
- Monarch: Abdullah II

Personal details
- Born: 1968 (age 57–58)
- Party: Independent
- Children: 3
- Education: American University in Paris (BA); Harvard University (MA); Boston University (MA); Geneva Graduate Institute Diplôme d'études supérieures (DES) and (PhD)
- Awards: Order of the Star of Jordan; Order of Independence (Jordan); Order of the Rising Sun; Order of Merit (Portugal); Order of the Crown (Belgium); Order of Merit of the Italian Republic

Jafar Hassan (Arabic: جعفر حسان; born 1968) is a Jordanian politician who has served as the Prime Minister of Jordan since 2024. Hassan worked in Jordan's diplomatic service and was chief of staff for Abdullah II of Jordan.

== Early life and education ==
Jafar Hassan was born in 1968. Hassan graduated with a diplôme d'études supérieures and a Ph.D. in Political Sciences and International Economics from the Graduate Institute of International and Development Studies in Geneva. He also holds graduate degrees from Harvard University Kennedy School of Government, Boston University and a bachelor of arts degree from the American University in Paris.

In 2020, Hassan was awarded the Gold and Silver Star of Japan's Order of the Rising Sun for strengthening ties between Jordan and Japan.

== Career ==
After joining Jordan's foreign service in 1991, Hassan was posted abroad to Washington D.C. and Geneva. From 2006 to 2009, he was director of the International Affairs Department at the Royal Hashemite Court. He was appointed Minister of Planning and International Cooperation in 2009, a position he held until 2013.

In 2014, he became chief of staff of the office of Jordan's King Abdullah II. In 2018, he was appointed deputy prime minister for economic affairs, and tasked with implementing reforms to cut public debt. In 2021, he became director of the office of the king.

== Prime Minister ==
On September 15, 2024, King Abdullah II appointed Hassan to succeed Bisher Khasawneh as Prime Minister of Jordan. His appointment occurred after Islamist politicians made gains in the 2024 election.

== Honours ==
=== National honours ===
- Jordan:
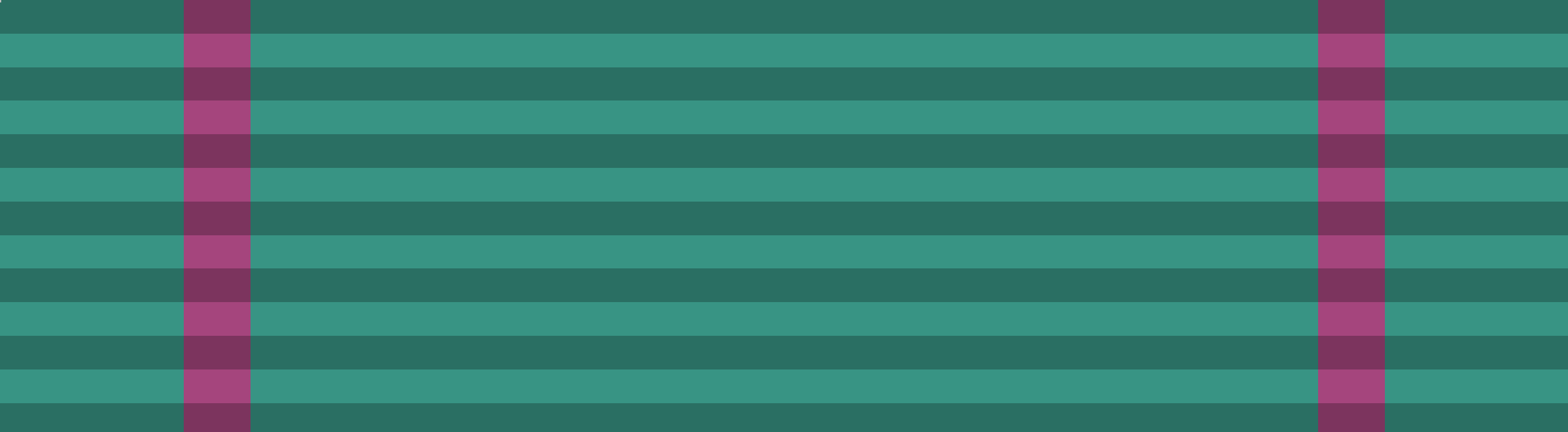
  - Order of the Star of Jordan
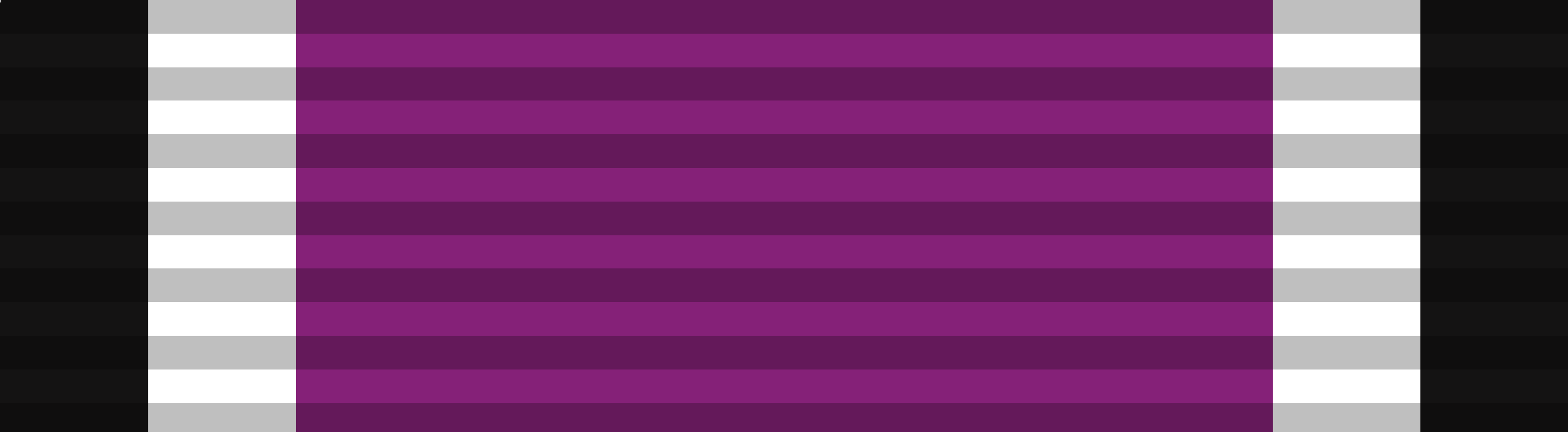
  - Order of Independence (Jordan)

=== Foreign honours ===
- Belgium:
  - Grand Cross of the Order of the Crown (Belgium)
- Italy:
  - Order of Merit of the Italian Republic
- Japan:
  - Gold and Silver Star of the Order of the Rising Sun
- Portugal:
  - Grand Cross of the Order of Merit

== Works cited ==
- "Jordan's King Abdullah names Jafar Hassan as new PM". Deutsche Welle. 15 September 2024. Archived from the original on 24 June 2025.
- Al-Khalidi, Suleiman (15 September 2024). "Jordan's king appoints Harvard-educated technocrat as prime minister". Prima.

Political offices
Preceded by Bisher Khasawneh	Prime Minister of Jordan; 2024–present	Incumbent
