= Bisher Khasawneh =

Prime Minister of Jordan (2020-2024)

- بشر الخصاونة
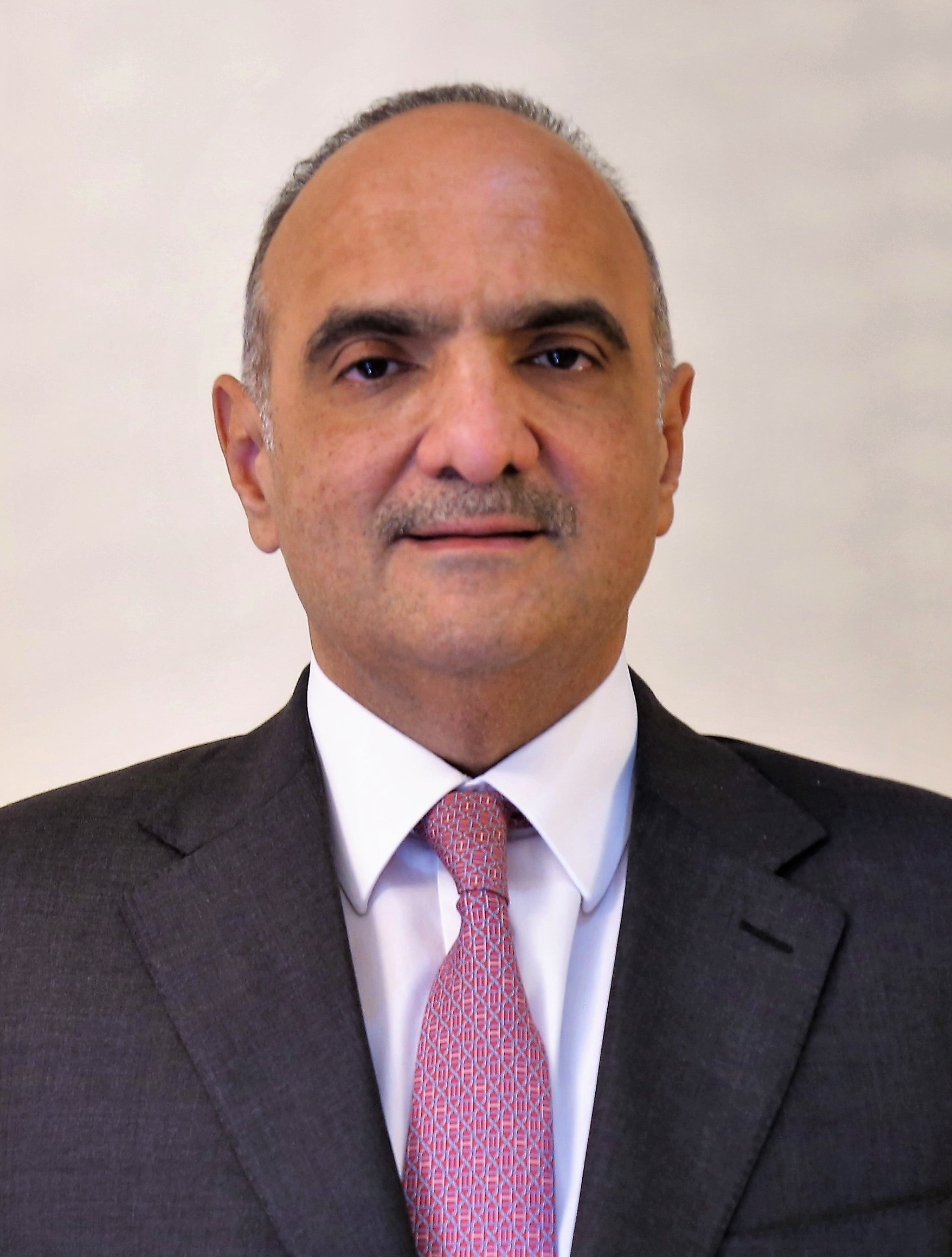
- Khasawneh in 2020

Prime Minister of Jordan
- In office 12 October 2020 – 15 September 2024
- Monarch: Abdullah II
- Preceded by: Omar Razzaz
- Succeeded by: Jafar Hassan

Minister of Defence
- In office 12 October 2020 – 15 September 2024
- Prime Minister: Himself

Adviser for Policies to King Abdullah II
- In office 18 August 2020 – 8 October 2020
- Monarch: Abdullah II

Adviser for Communication and Coordination to King Abdullah II
- In office 23 April 2019 – 17 August 2020
- Monarch: Abdullah II

Minister of State for Legal Affairs
- In office 15 January 2017 – 15 February 2018
- Monarch: Abdullah II
- Preceded by: Ibrahim Al Jazi
- Succeeded by: Ahmad Ali Al Oaidi

Minister of State for Foreign Affairs
- In office 28 September 2016 – 15 January 2017
- Monarch: Abdullah II

Personal details
- Born: 27 January 1969 (age 57) Amman, Jordan
- Spouse: Rana Sultan
- Children: 3
- Education: University of Jordan (LLB); SOAS University of London (MA); London School of Economics (LLM, PhD)
- Awards: Order of the Star of Jordan; Order of Independence

Bisher Khasawneh (Arabic: بشر الخصاونة; born 27 January 1969) is a Jordanian politician and diplomat who served as the 43rd Prime Minister of Jordan and Minister of Defence from 12 October 2020 to 15 September 2024.

Khasawneh was an ambassador of Jordan to Egypt, France, Kenya, Ethiopia, African Union, League of Arab States, and to UNESCO. He also served as Coordinator General and Director of the Peace Process and Negotiations Bureau in Jordan. He served as Minister of State for Foreign Affairs between 2016 and 2017. He subsequently was Minister of State for Legal Affairs between 2017 and 2018. He served as the adviser to King Abdullah II for Communication and Coordination at The Royal Hashemite Court between April 2019 and August 2020. Until his appointment as Prime Minister Khasawneh served as the adviser to the King for Policies.

== Early life ==
Khasawneh was born on 27 January 1975, in Amman, which is the capital of Jordan.

== Education ==
- Bachelor degree in Law, University of Jordan
- Executive Diploma, counter-radicalization and counter-terrorism, National Defense University
- Executive Diploma, Public Policies, Harvard University Kennedy School
- Master of Arts, International Affairs, Diplomacy and Economics, SOAS, University of London
- Master of Laws in International Law and Doctor of Philosophy in Law, London School of Economics.

== Life and career ==
Khasawneh's father Hani was a leader of the Ba'ath Party. He studied at the School of Oriental and African Studies and then obtained a doctorate in law from the London School of Economics and Political Science.

In October 2004, Khasawneh held a speech at the fifty-ninth session of the United Nations general assembly. From June 2012 until September 2016, Khasawneh served as Jordanian ambassador to Egypt.

On 28 September 2016, he was named Minister of State for Foreign Affairs in Hani Mulki's cabinet. On 15 January 2017, he was named Minister of State for Legal Affairs in a cabinet reshuffle by Prime Minister Hani Mulki. Khasawneh was sworn in as Jordan's Ambassador to France on 31 August 2018.

On 23 April 2019, he was named adviser for Communication and Coordination to King Abdullah II in The Royal Hashemite Court. On 18 August 2020, he was named as adviser to the king for policies.

Upon his appointment as Prime Minister on 8 October 2020, King Abdullah II instructed him to improve the capabilities of the state in the COVID-19 pandemic in Jordan. He was also tasked with overseeing the November 2020 parliamentary elections. His cabinet, in which he also serves as Minister of Defence, was sworn in on 12 October 2020. Al-Khasawneh stated he wanted to overhaul the Jordan economy, while focusing on developing a public safety net and planning a realistic government budget. Al-Khasawneh declared in a speech to the Jordan parliament in January 2021 that Jordan would receive 1 million doses of COVID-19 vaccine from BioNTech/Pfizer and 2 million doses from the COVAX initiative led by the Global Alliance for Vaccines and Immunization (GAVI), the World Health Organization (WHO), and the Coalition for Epidemic Preparedness Innovations (CEPI).

== Positions ==
- President of the Legal Committee Council of Ministers of Jordan
- Member of Economic Development and Services and Social Affairs Committees Council of Ministers of Jordan
- Part time Lecturer at the Faculty of Law at the University of Jordan and Jordan Institute of Diplomacy
- Director General of Jordan Information Centre
- Advisor at the Prime Ministry of Jordan at the Bureau of Legislation at the Prime Ministry
- Chairperson of the board of Jordan Center for Disease Control.

== Awards ==
- Order of the Star of Jordan (Third Class)
- Order of Independence (First and Second Class)
- Supreme Order of the Renaissance (First class).
- Royal Norwegian Order of Merit Category I- Grand cross.
- The Royal Order of polar star- Commander grand cross.
- Order of State Centennial (Jordan).

== See also ==
- Bisher Al-Khasawneh's Cabinet
- Hani Al-Khasawneh

Political offices
Preceded by Omar Razzaz	Prime Minister of Jordan; 2020–2024	Succeeded by Jafar Hassan
