= Jordan–European Union relations =

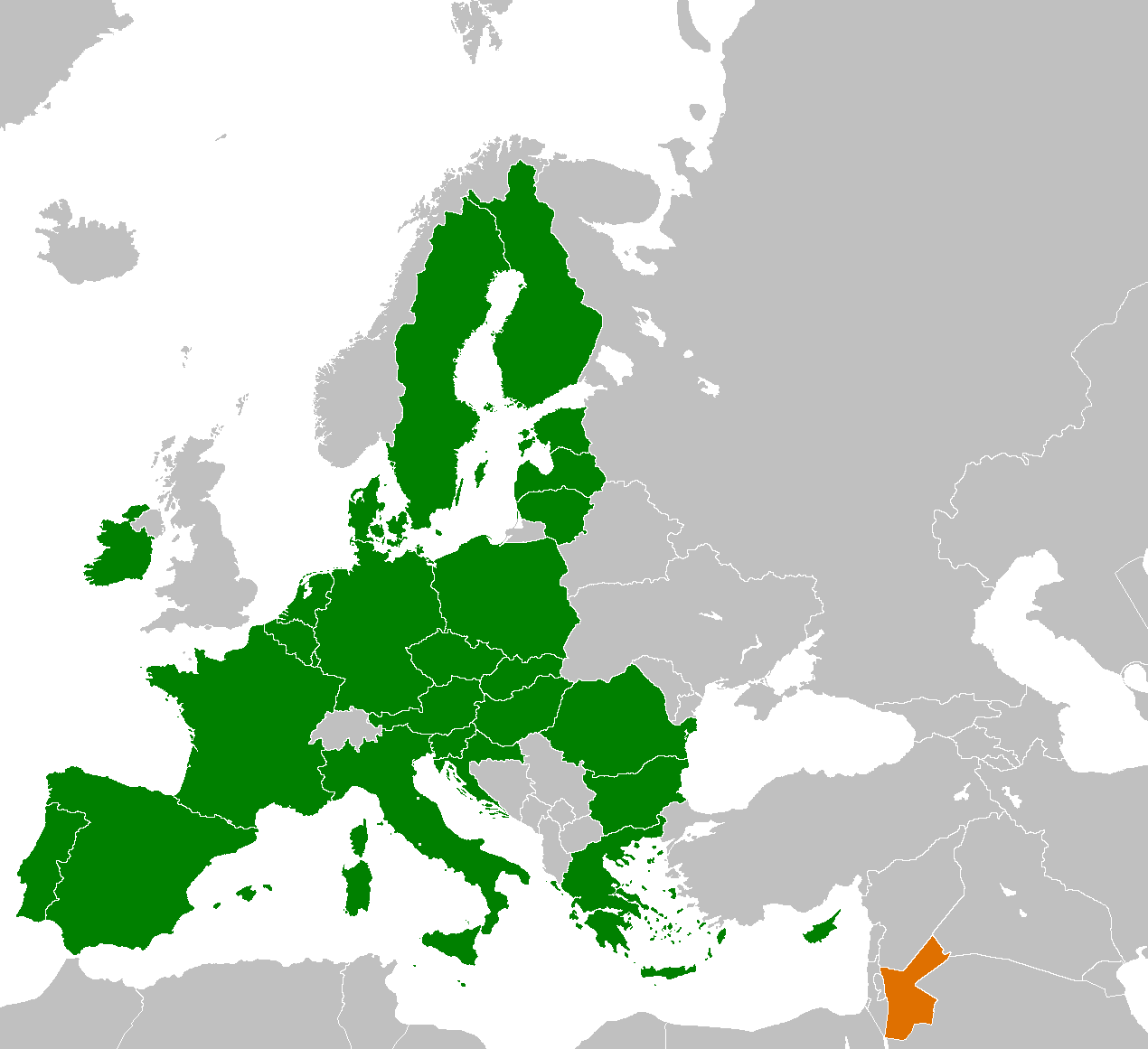

- European Union: Jordan

Relations between the European Union (EU) and the Hashemite Kingdom of Jordan are outlined by a number of agreements and close co-operation. The EU is Jordan's main trading partner.

== Trade ==
The EU is Jordan's biggest trade partner, accounting for 12% of its trade in 2021. Total trade in goods between the EU and Jordan amounted to €4.9 billion in 2022.

EU exports to Jordan surpassed €4 billion in 2022, a significant increase from €2.6 billion in 2008. EU imports from Jordan totaled €0.7 billion, with chemicals accounting for the largest share (€0.34 billion, 46%). The largest EU exports were chemicals (€0.67 billion, 16%), machinery and appliances (€0.64 billion, 15%), and vegetables (€0.61 billion, 15%).

In 2021, two-way trade in services between the EU and Jordan totaled €1.36 billion, with EU service exports reaching €0.9 billion and imports amounting to €0.46 billion. Total trade in services rose significantly in 2022, reaching approximately €2 billion.

Jordan also benefits from substantial foreign direct investment (FDI) from the EU, which totaled €3 billion in 2022. Jordan's FDI in the EU amounted to €0.6 billion. This marks a notable increase from €265 million in FDI and EU financial assistance to Jordan in 2008.

== Agreements ==
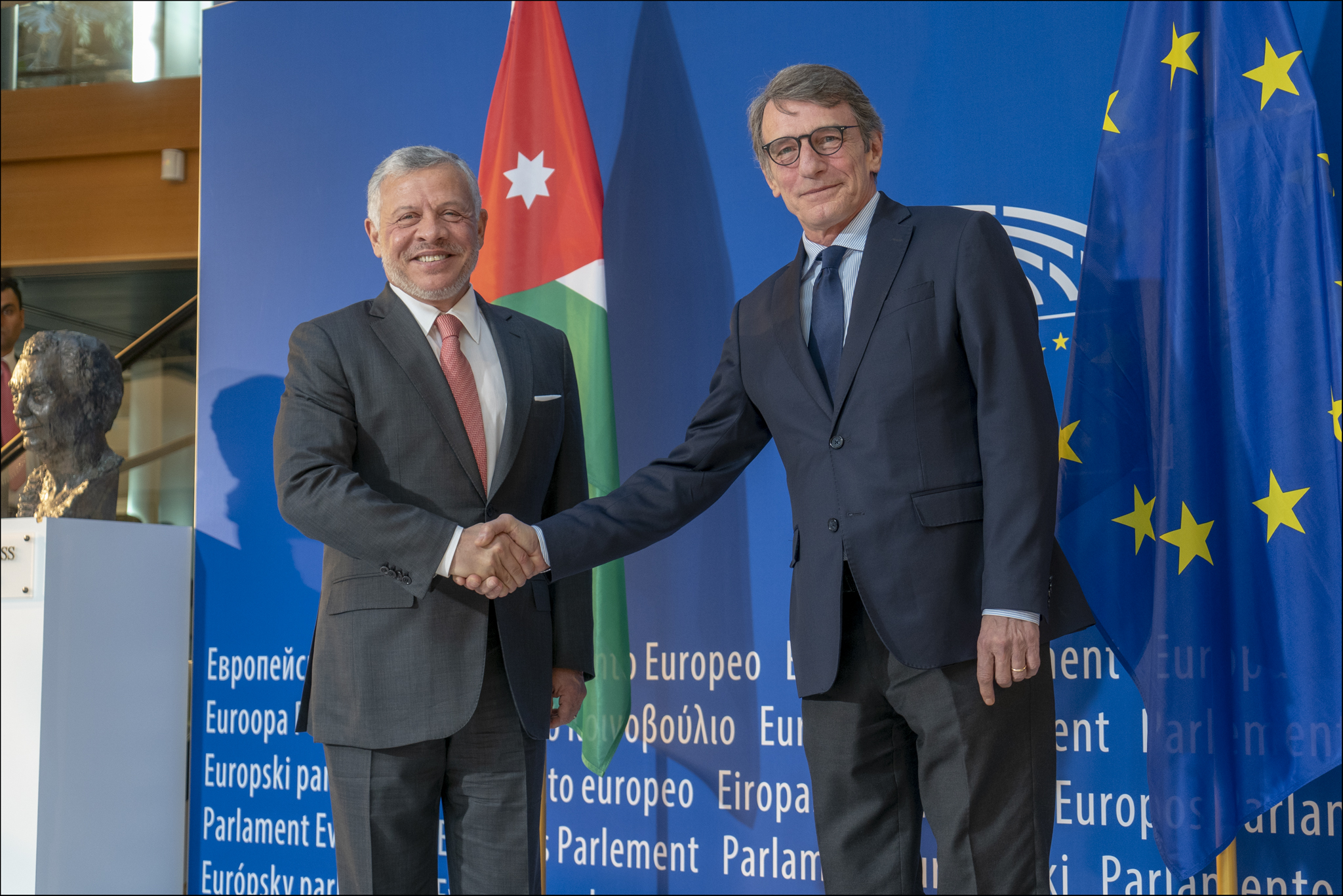
Jordanian King Abdullah II with President of the European Parliament David Sassoli in 2020

Jordan's relations with the EU are within an action plan and association agreement as part of the European Neighbourhood Policy. Jordan is also a member of the EU's Union for the Mediterranean. The EU's Association Agreement with Jordan was signed on 24 November 1997. It entered into force on 1 May 2002, replacing the Co-operation Agreement of 1977. The agreement will progressively establish a free trade area between the EU and Jordan over 12 years, in conformity with WTO rules.

In November 2008, during the first meeting of the EU-Jordan Association Council in Brussels, Jordan submitted a request for an “advanced status”, under which the Kingdom would be considered more than an EU partner. EU officials said they are holding ongoing meetings at the ministerial level in order to assess Jordan's progress on certain criteria to receive the distinction, under which the Kingdom will be eligible for socio-economic programmes previously restricted to EU members.

“This will be important, not only for Jordan but also for the EU countries. Once this step is taken, Jordan will be eligible to participate in programmes that used to be exclusive to EU member states,” Patrick Renauld, head of the European Commission (EC) Delegation in Jordan, said during a lunch with media representatives on Tuesday.

“The aim is not only to create more durable links between us, but also to start a deeper dialogue to implement joint policies, particularly in priority sectors in Jordan and the EU, especially in the energy, water and transport sectors,” Renauld said.

The European Union (EU) is expected to approve the Kingdom's request for advanced status relations with EU member states by 2011, according to EU officials.

On October 26 2011, Jordan and the European Union agreed the European Neighborhood Policy (ENP) Action Plan, under which the Kingdom enters into an “advanced status” partnership with the supranational institution.

On 6 October 2022, Jordanian Minister of Planning and International Cooperation Nasser Shraideh announced to sign an agreement with the European Investment Bank (EIB) regarding food security in Jordan worth €130 million.

In December 2025 it was reported that The European Parliament has approved a €500 million assistance package to Jordan, aimed at supporting the country's economic stability and reform efforts. This comes as part of the European Union's broader cooperation and strategic partnership with Jordan, helping the kingdom address fiscal challenges amid regional pressures.

== Jordan's foreign relations with EU member states ==
- Austria
- Belgium
- Bulgaria
- Croatia
- Cyprus
- Czech Republic
- Denmark
- Estonia
- Finland
- France
- Germany
- Greece
- Hungary
- (Republic of Ireland) Ireland
- Italy
- Latvia
- Lithuania
- Luxembourg
- Malta
- Netherlands
- Poland
- Portugal
- Romania
- Slovakia
- Slovenia
- Spain
- Sweden

== See also ==
- Foreign relations of the European Union
- Foreign relations of Jordan
