= Jordan–Thailand relations =

- Jordan: Thailand

Diplomatic mission
- Embassy of Jordan in Kuala Lumpur (accredited): Embassy of Thailand, Amman

Envoy
- Ambassador of Jordan Mr. Ismail Maaitah: Ambassador of Thailand Mr. Supark Prongthura

Jordan–Thailand relations refer to the bilateral relations between the Kingdom of Thailand and the Hashemite Kingdom of Jordan. Diplomatic relations were established on 10 November 1966.

== History ==
Relations between Thailand and Jordan were established in 1966. Initially, the Royal Thai Embassy in Baghdad was accredited to Jordan. However, due to security concerns in Baghdad in 2003, the embassy temporarily relocated its office to Amman, Jordan. In March 2007, the Thai government converted the temporary office into a permanent Embassy in Amman, with jurisdiction covering Iraq as well.

== State visits ==
In December 2005, King Abdullah II paid an official visit to Thailand and met with King Bhumibol Adulyadej to discuss strengthening bilateral ties.

In June 2006, King Abdullah II, accompanied by members of the Royal Family, visited Thailand again to attend the 60th Anniversary Celebrations of King Bhumibol Adulyadej's Accession to the Throne.

== Society ==
=== Education ===
Before 2011, there were only about 50 Thai students majoring in Arabic language and Sharia. By 2017, this number increased to 700 and continues to grow annually. In 2021, approximately 600 Thai students were enrolled in Jordanian universities, mostly studying Sharia (Islamic Law) and Jurisprudence. The northern city of Irbid hosts the largest Thai student population, with around 300 students.

=== Culture ===
Thailand and Jordan celebrated 55 years of diplomatic relations by signing a Cultural Exchange Programme for 2022–2026 via an online system, alongside a Thai-Jordanian photo exhibition. In 2014, the Thai Ministry of Foreign Affairs, in collaboration with the Ministry of Culture, sent a troupe from the Bunditpatanasilpa Institute to perform for the public in Amman.

=== Tourism ===
In 2023, 10,943 Jordanians visited Thailand, a decrease of 11.68% compared to 2019 before the COVID-19 pandemic.

== Trade and investment ==
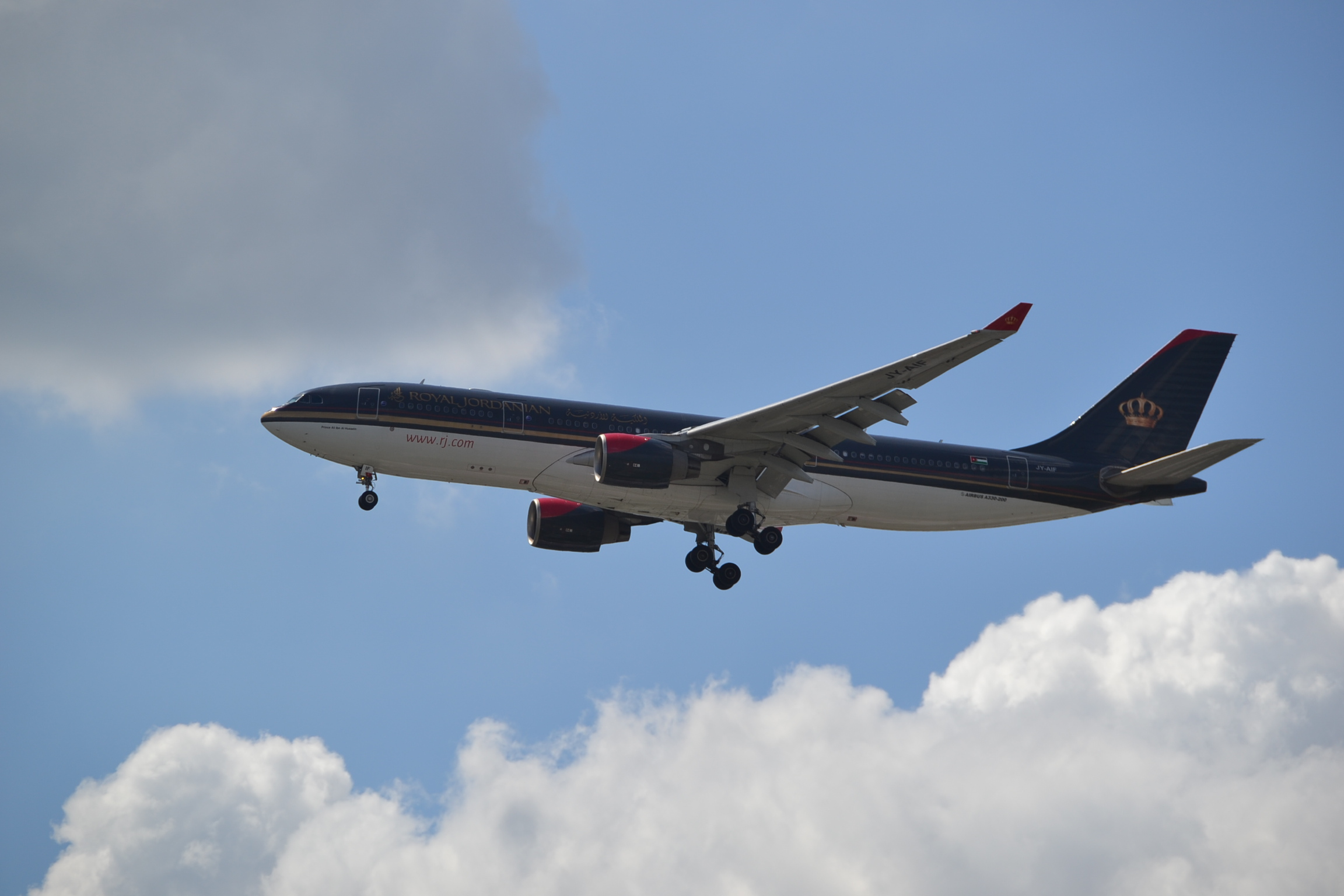
A Royal Jordanian Airlines Airbus A330 landing at Bangkok Suvarnabhumi Airport (BKK) in September 2015.

In 2024, the total trade value between Thailand and Jordan was US$182.01 million. Thai exports were valued at US$127.45 million, while imports from Jordan were US$54.56 million, resulting in a trade surplus for Thailand of US$72.90 million. According to the United Nations COMTRADE database, Jordan's imports from Thailand reached US$195.58 million in 2023. The largest import category was vehicles other than railway or tramway, valued at US$60.67 million, with motor vehicles for transport of goods being the primary item (US$53.47 million). Thailand's imports from Jordan were valued at US$53.3 million, with potassium fertilizers (US$41.9 million) being the most popular product.

In January 2020, the Thai Ambassador to Jordan met with the CEO of Family's Basket supermarket at Taj Mall, Amman, to discuss expanding the market for Thai exports in Jordan and enhancing commercial cooperation.

== International assistance ==
=== Financial aid ===
Due to the Syrian Civil War, which resulted in a massive influx of refugees into Jordan, Thailand has sought to work more closely with Jordanian authorities. The Thai Embassy recommended that the Thai government provide assistance by donating to the Jordan Hashemite Charity Organization (JHCO), the primary humanitarian agency managing refugee camps along the Jordan-Syria border.

=== Technology ===
In 2016, Thailand transferred Royal Rainmaking technology to Jordan. The Thai Department of Royal Rainmaking and Agricultural Aviation organized three training courses for Jordanian officials to implement weather modification programs.

== Resident diplomatic missions ==
- Jordan is accredited to Thailand from its embassy in Kuala Lumpur, Malaysia.
- Thailand has an embassy in Amman.

== See also ==
- Foreign relations of Jordan
- Foreign relations of Thailand
