= Foreign relations of Jordan =

The foreign relations of Jordan have been consistently a pro-Western foreign policy.

== United Kingdom and United States ==
Jordan has had close relations with the United States and the United Kingdom for many years. During the first Gulf War (1990), these relations were damaged by Jordan's neutrality and its maintenance of relations with Iraq. Later, Jordan restored its relations with Western countries through its participation in the enforcement of UN sanctions against Iraq and in the Southwest Asia peace process. After King Hussein's death in 1999, relations between Jordan and the Persian Gulf countries greatly improved.

In 2000, Jordan signed a Free Trade Agreement with the United States, which went into effect in 2010.

In 2013, the U.S. approved the CIA–led Timber Sycamore covert operation, based in Jordan, to train and arm Syrian rebels.

== European Union ==
Jordan enjoys "advanced status" with the European Union and is part of the European Neighbourhood Policy, which aims to increase links between the EU and its neighbours.

== Regional neighbours ==
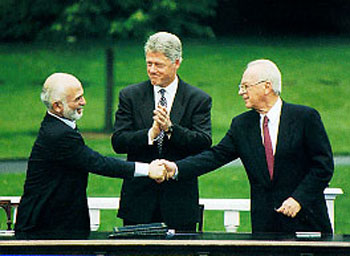
Hussein I of Jordan and Yitzhak Rabin, with Bill Clinton, after signing the Israel-Jordan Treaty of Peace, 26 October 1994

Owing to its location, bordering Israel, Syria, and Iraq, Jordan has experienced wars along its borders for decades, and maintains careful diplomatic relations with Israel and its main ally, the U.S.

Along with Egypt and the United Arab Emirates, as of 2009 Jordan was one of only three Arab nations to have signed peace treaties with Israel, Jordan's direct neighbour.

Jordan views an independent Palestinian state with the 1967 borders, as part of the two-state solution and of supreme national interest. The ruling Hashemite dynasty has had custodianship over holy sites in Jerusalem since 1924, a position reinforced in the Israel–Jordan peace treaty. Turmoil in Jerusalem's Al-Aqsa mosque between Israelis and Palestinians created tensions between Jordan and Israel concerning the former's role in protecting the Muslim and Christian sites in Jerusalem.

Jordan signed a non-aggression pact with Israel (the Washington Declaration) in Washington, D.C., on 25 July 1994. Jordan and Israel signed a historic peace treaty on October 26, 1994, witnessed by President Clinton, accompanied by Secretary of State Warren Christopher. The U.S. has participated with Jordan and Israel in trilateral development discussions during which key issues have been water-sharing and security; cooperation on Jordan Rift Valley development; infrastructure projects; and trade, finance, and banking issues.

Israel captured East Jerusalem and the West Bank, which was annexed by Jordan since 1950, in 1967. Since 1967, Pakistan has been demanding its vacation at the international level. Jordan, together with Pakistan, is playing an effective role in the Organisation of Islamic Cooperation.

=== Gaza war ===
The political landscape of Jordan has changed as a consequence of the conflict between Israel and Hamas from October 2023. Prime minister Bisher al Khasawneh expressed his country's disapproval of Israel's offensive in Gaza by recalling its ambassador from Israel, and declared that Israel's ambassador, who had departed Amman following Hamas' attack, would not be permitted to return. Khasawneh argued that Israel's blockade of the heavily populated Gaza Strip could not be justified as self-defense, and criticised the indiscriminate Israeli assault, which had included safe zones and ambulances in its targets.

Jordanian residents (including the approximately 2 million Palestinian refugees and others with Palestinian roots) have staged protests against Israel's actions in Gaza, which adds pressure to the government to take action on the issue. There is also evidence that there is more sympathy with Hamas among Jordanians in recent years. However, Jordan's Western allies view the kingdom as a potentially vital mediator, should Israel and Hamas agree to negotiate. King Abdullah has been taking part in diplomatic meetings in Europe, aiming to secure safe passage of humanitarian aid; however, the government is also grappling with domestic problems such as inflation, unemployment, and trafficking of arms and drugs through Jordan to the West Bank. The king and Queen Rania have criticised Israel's action in Gaza, and called for a ceasefire. Jordan's ambassador to Israel was recalled, and the Israeli ambassador was told to stay away. Queen Rania, whose family is Palestinian with roots in the West Bank town of Nablus, called on Western leaders to denounce Israel's attacks on Palestinian civilians in an interview aired on CNN in the U.S. There are fears of a huge influx of refugees into Jordan as a result of the Gaza war.

== UN and other affiliations ==
Jordan is an active member of the UN and several of its specialised and related agencies, including the Food and Agriculture Organization, International Atomic Energy Agency, and World Health Organization. Jordan is a founding member of the Organisation of Islamic Cooperation and of the Arab League.

It is also a member of the World Bank, the International Monetary Fund, the Organisation of Islamic Cooperation, and the Non-Aligned Movement.

Jordan and Morocco tried to join the Gulf Cooperation Council in 2011, but the Gulf countries offered a five-year development aid programme instead.

== Others ==
On February 3, 2025, the Jordan Chamber of Commerce and the Uzbekistan Chamber of Commerce and Industry signed a memorandum of understanding to enhance trade and economic cooperation. The agreement includes organizing joint events, exchanging delegations, supporting small and medium-sized enterprises, and addressing trade barriers to foster investment partnerships.

== Diplomatic relations ==
List of countries which Jordan maintains diplomatic relations with:

| # | Country | Date |
|---|---|---|
| 1 | United Kingdom | 17 June 1946 |
| 2 | Lebanon | 1 October 1946 |
| 3 | Turkey | 11 January 1947 |
| 4 | Spain | 19 April 1947 |
| 5 | Belgium | 4 May 1947 |
| 6 | Iraq | 24 May 1947 |
| 7 | Egypt | 28 May 1947 |
| 8 | Pakistan | 29 December 1947 |
| 9 | Greece | 1947 |
| 10 | France | 12 January 1948 |
| 11 | Afghanistan | 5 February 1948 |
| 12 | Saudi Arabia | 12 August 1948 |
| 13 | Syria | 1948 |
| 14 | United States | 18 February 1949 |
| 15 | Switzerland | 26 March 1949 |
| 16 | Italy | 14 August 1949 |
| 17 | Iran | 16 November 1949 |
| 18 | India | 27 January 1950 |
| 19 | Indonesia | 27 February 1950 |
| 20 | Austria | 6 April 1951 |
| 21 | Netherlands | 15 December 1951 |
| 22 | Serbia | 23 June 1953 |
| 23 | Germany | 17 November 1953 |
| 24 | Japan | 14 July 1954 |
| 25 | Venezuela | 1 August 1954 |
| 26 | Argentina | 23 August 1954 |
| 27 | Chile | 28 September 1954 |
| 28 | Morocco | 1956 |
| 29 | Sudan | 1956 |
| 30 | Tunisia | 1956 |
| 31 | Sweden | 14 December 1957 |
| 32 | Denmark | 18 January 1958 |
| 33 | Brazil | 6 April 1959 |
| 34 | Finland | 28 November 1959 |
| 35 | Ethiopia | 16 May 1960 |
| 36 | Yemen | 17 April 1961 |
| 37 | Libya | 30 August 1961 |
| 38 | Nigeria | 30 September 1961 |
| 39 | Kuwait | 2 December 1961 |
| 40 | Cyprus | 26 February 1962 |
| 41 | South Korea | 26 July 1962 |
| 42 | Algeria | December 1962 |
| 43 | Russia | 21 August 1963 |
| 44 | Poland | 20 February 1964 |
| 45 | Czech Republic | 30 April 1964 |
| 46 | Hungary | 16 May 1964 |
| 47 | Bulgaria | 9 October 1964 |
| 48 | Canada | 23 December 1964 |
| 49 | Romania | 2 April 1965 |
| 50 | Sri Lanka | 6 July 1965 |
| 51 | Nepal | 20 August 1965 |
| 52 | Guinea | 17 May 1966 |
| 53 | Malaysia | 13 September 1966 |
| 54 | Thailand | 10 November 1966 |
| 55 | Somalia | 24 December 1966 |
| 56 | Norway | 7 January 1969 |
| 57 | Senegal | 12 July 1969 |
| 58 | Chad | January 1970 |
| 59 | Mauritania | 4 May 1970 |
| 60 | United Arab Emirates | 8 December 1971 |
| 61 | Qatar | 18 May 1972 |
| 62 | Bahrain | 10 June 1972 |
| 63 | Oman | 11 June 1972 |
| 64 | Uganda | 27 June 1972 |
| 65 | Portugal | 5 July 1972 |
| 66 | Bangladesh | 15 October 1973 |
| 67 | Luxembourg | 5 December 1973 |
| 68 | Malta | 4 June 1974 |
| — | North Korea (suspended) | 5 July 1974 |
| 69 | Cambodia | September 1974 |
| 70 | Australia | 29 April 1975 |
| 71 | Mexico | 9 July 1975 |
| 72 | Mauritius | February 1976 |
| 73 | Philippines | 1 March 1976 |
| 74 | China | 7 April 1977 |
| 75 | Cuba | 7 September 1979 |
| 76 | Ecuador | 1 January 1980 |
| 77 | Vietnam | 19 August 1980 |
| 78 | Maldives | 25 March 1981 |
| 79 | Mongolia | 21 May 1981 |
| 80 | Colombia | 22 October 1982 |
| 81 | Djibouti | 3 April 1984 |
| 82 | Ireland | 15 May 1984 |
| 83 | Brunei | 18 February 1985 |
| 84 | Peru | 21 October 1985 |
| 85 | Uruguay | 14 January 1987 |
| 86 | Albania | 18 May 1987 |
| 87 | New Zealand | 25 October 1987 |
| 88 | Mali | 25 April 1988 |
| 89 | Singapore | 28 July 1988 |
| — | State of Palestine | 7 January 1989 |
| 90 | Guatemala | 31 January 1990 |
| 91 | Niger | 25 July 1990 |
| 92 | Iceland | 5 December 1990 |
| 93 | Nicaragua | 27 May 1991 |
| 94 | Ukraine | 19 April 1992 |
| 95 | San Marino | 13 July 1992 |
| 96 | Burkina Faso | 15 July 1992 |
| 97 | Bolivia | 8 February 1993 |
| 98 | Kazakhstan | 9 February 1993 |
| 99 | Kyrgyzstan | 10 February 1993 |
| 100 | Azerbaijan | 13 February 1993 |
| 101 | Uzbekistan | 15 February 1993 |
| 102 | Turkmenistan | 18 February 1993 |
| 103 | Slovakia | 3 March 1993 |
| 104 | Eritrea | 15 July 1993 |
| 105 | South Africa | 28 September 1993 |
| 106 | Slovenia | 22 October 1993 |
| 107 | Panama | 7 February 1994 |
| — | Holy See | 3 March 1994 |
| 108 | Bosnia and Herzegovina | 7 March 1994 |
| 109 | Georgia | 6 May 1994 |
| 110 | Croatia | 29 June 1994 |
| 111 | Lithuania | 5 July 1994 |
| 112 | Latvia | 12 September 1994 |
| 113 | Israel | 27 November 1994 |
| 114 | Armenia | 18 June 1996 |
| 115 | Honduras | 23 July 1996 |
| 116 | Belarus | 15 October 1996 |
| 117 | Moldova | 19 June 1997 |
| 118 | Guyana | 19 August 1998 |
| 119 | Kenya | 1998 |
| 120 | Malawi | 23 June 1999 |
| 121 | Andorra | 3 March 2000 |
| 122 | North Macedonia | 15 September 2000 |
| 123 | Estonia | 24 January 2001 |
| 124 | Democratic Republic of the Congo | 16 September 2002 |
| — | Sovereign Military Order of Malta | 29 June 2003 |
| 125 | Angola | 15 July 2004 |
| 126 | Paraguay | 15 November 2005 |
| 127 | Zambia | 6 June 2006 |
| 128 | Belize | 28 June 2006 |
| 129 | Costa Rica | 10 January 2007 |
| 130 | El Salvador | 10 January 2007 |
| 131 | Gambia | 13 March 2007 |
| 132 | Ghana | 5 June 2007 |
| 133 | Liberia | 10 December 2007 |
| 134 | Dominican Republic | 23 September 2008 |
| 135 | Montenegro | 19 May 2010 |
| 136 | Fiji | 15 November 2011 |
| 137 | Tajikistan | 13 January 2012 |
| 138 | Mozambique | 9 August 2012 |
| 139 | Sierra Leone | 3 December 2012 |
| — | Kosovo | 4 June 2013 |
| 140 | Benin | 4 June 2014 |
| 141 | South Sudan | 1 March 2015 |
| 142 | Ivory Coast | 15 April 2015 |
| 143 | Tanzania | 3 June 2015 |
| 144 | Rwanda | 4 June 2017 |
| 145 | Kiribati | 8 August 2017 |
| 146 | Antigua and Barbuda | 27 September 2017 |
| 147 | Comoros | 2 September 2018 |
| 148 | Saint Kitts and Nevis | 9 December 2020 |
| 149 | Monaco | 29 April 2021 |
| 150 | Republic of the Congo | 5 December 2021 |
| 151 | Jamaica | 23 September 2023 |
| 152 | Guinea-Bissau | 3 March 2024 |
| 153 | Zimbabwe | 3 March 2024 |
| 154 | Timor-Leste | 22 November 2024 |
| 155 | Liechtenstein | 2024 |
| 156 | Equatorial Guinea | 17 January 2025 |
| 157 | Burundi | 20 February 2025 |
| 158 | Lesotho | 7 May 2025 |
| 159 | Grenada | 24 May 2025 |
| 160 | Laos | 7 January 2026 |
| 161 | Trinidad and Tobago | 6 July 2026 |
| 162 | Bhutan | 3 August 2026 |
| 163 | Togo | 25 September 2026 |
| 164 | Barbados | 18 November 2026 |

== List of bilateral relations ==
| Country | Formal Relations Began | Notes |
|---|---|---|
| Brunei | | In May 2008, King Abdullah II visited Brunei, to bolster ties between Jordan and the southeast Asian nation, as well as discuss issues facing the Muslim world. Along with Sultan of Brunei Darussalam, Abdullah signed agreements devised to enhance cooperation in the economic, tourism and defense fields. |
| Chile | 28 September 1954 | Both countries established diplomatic relations on 28 September 1954 when has been accredited Envoy Extraordinary and Minister Plenipotentiary of Jordan to Chile Mr. Issa Bandak. |
| China | 7 April 1977 | See China–Jordan relations: Jordan recognized the Republic of China on Taiwan in August 1957, official diplomatic relations of the People's Republic of China began on 7 April 1977; 2 Confucius Institutes were established in Jordan, the first at the Talal Abu-Ghazaleh Global organization in September 2008 and the second at Amman's Philadelphia University, in September 2012. |
| Denmark | 18 January 1958 | Both countries established diplomatic relations on 18 January 1958 when was accredited first Ambassador of Denmark to Jordan (resident in Cairo) Mr. Eggert Holten: Denmark has an honorary consulate in Amman.; Jordan has an honorary consulate in Copenhagen |
| Egypt | 28 May 1947 | See Egypt–Jordan relations Both countries established diplomatic relations on 28 May 1947 when Mohamed Bey Yassin, Egyptian Minister in Transjordan with residence in Baghdad presented his credentials. |
| France | | France is Jordan's biggest European investor: Jordan has an embassy in Paris; France has an embassy in Amman |
| Germany | | See Germany–Jordan relations: Both countries are close allies and Germany is the second-largest bilateral donor of development aid to Jordan after the United States.; Germany has an embassy in Amman.; Jordan has an embassy in Berlin. |
| Greece | | See Greece–Jordan relations: Greece has an embassy in Amman.; Jordan has an embassy in Athens. |
| Holy See | | See Holy See–Jordan relations The Holy See has a nunciature in Amman. Jordan has an embassy in Rome accredited to the Holy See. The Holy See has maintained comparatively good relations with Jordan. The name of the country comes from the Jordan River, which is significant to Christians because it was the place where Jesus was baptized by John the Baptist. Various Christian clerics in the Arab world have a Jordanian background, such as Maroun Lahham in Tunisia and Fouad Twal in Palestine. |
| India | | See India–Jordan relations The Republic of India and the Hashemite Kingdom of Jordan signed their first bilateral agreement for cooperation and friendly relations in 1947, which was formalised in 1950 when India became a sovereign democratic republic. The Ministry of External Affairs of the Government of India stated in August 2011 that, 'India and Jordan have very warm, cordial and cooperative relations; and it is our hope that the existing mutually beneficial relationship would be further deepened and strengthened in the days ahead.' Indian tourists visited Jordan in large numbers in 2010, with nearly 51,000 visitors. Apart from this, military, cultural and economic exchanges between the two nations is widespread. Quoting the Indian Foreign Ministry, 'India was the largest export partner and ninth largest import partner of Jordan in 2008. The trade turnover between the two countries stood at US$1.785 billion in 2008 i.e. Jordan's imports from India stood at about US$503 million in 2008 while its exports to India reached at US$1.283 billion in 2008. India's position in 2009 is third and fifteenth respectively as the trade turnover between the two countries stood at US$983 million in 2009 i.e. India's exports to Jordan in 2009 stood at US$297 million while imports were valued at US$686 million. In 2010, the India-Jordan trade volume stood at US$1.16 billion i.e. India's exports to Jordan stood at US$382 million in 2010 while imports were to the tune of US$783 million in 2010.' Jordan is also a member of the Non-Aligned Movement and has thus forged close relations with India. |
| Iran | | See Iran–Jordan relations: Iran has an embassy in Amman.; Jordan has an embassy in Tehran. |
| Iraq | 24 May 1947 | See Iraq–Jordan relations Both countries established diplomatic relations on 24 May 1947 when Jamil Pasha el Rawi, the first Iraqi Minister to Transjordan, presented his credentials. Despite periodic crises of confidence and lingering Iraqi resentment over Jordan's close ties with Saddam Hussein, the two countries have managed to forge deep ties, in fact, Jordan has taken the lead among Arab states to do so. In the face of repeated attacks and threats, Jordan has maintained a strong diplomatic presence in Baghdad. The economic impact of the Iraq crisis in Jordan has been mixed. Jordan has benefited greatly from serving as a "gateway" to Iraq for governments, aid workers, contractors, and businesspeople, the real estate and banking sectors are booming, and it stands to reap more benefits from increased trade and transport should the situation in Iraq improve. However, with the fall of Saddam Hussein, Jordan lost the sizable oil subsidies and customary shipments it received from Iraq. |
| Israel | 27 November 1994 | See Israel–Jordan relations Both countries established full diplomatic relations with the ratification of the peace treaty on 27 November 1994. Jordan and Israel have had official relations since 1994, when their leaders signed a peace treaty. Historically, Jordan has had relatively warm relations with Israel compared to other Arab nations. Jordan, Egypt, the UAE, Bahrain and Morocco are the only Arab nations to have signed peace treaties with Israel. |
| Japan | | Japan is one of Jordan’s biggest donors. |
| Kosovo | | Jordan recognised the independence of the Republic of Kosovo on 7 July 2009. Jordan supported Kosovo at the International Court of Justice's advisory opinion on Kosovo's declaration of independence in December 2009. |
| Kuwait | | See Jordan–Kuwait relations Kuwait's relations with Jordan weakened during the Gulf War because of Jordan's stand with Iraq. However, the two nations have apparently decided to bury the past. King Abdullah II and the Emir of Kuwait are working to restore good relations and further strengthen them. |
| Lebanon | | See Jordan–Lebanon relations: Jordan has an embassy in Beirut.; Lebanon has an embassy in Amman. |
| Malaysia | | See Jordan–Malaysia relations Jordan has an embassy in Kuala Lumpur, and Malaysia has an embassy in Amman. Relations between the two countries are mainly in economic and Islamic affairs. |
| Mexico | | See Jordan–Mexico relations: Jordan has an embassy in Mexico City.; Mexico has an embassy in Amman. |
| Pakistan | | See Jordan–Pakistan relations The preliminary and initial forms of Pakistan-Jordan contact can date as early as up to the 1970s and 1980s, although associations have risen at firmer altitudes since the mid-1990s up to 2000. In 2001, some prominent Pakistani leaders completed a visit to Amman, where they discussed with leaders of Jordan about pledging full-scale cooperations. In the duration of the convention, the King of Jordan had lauded what he called "deep, strong and historical relations" between the two countries and affirmed Jordan's keenness on consolidating its ties with Pakistan for the benefit of the two peoples. |
| Palestine | | See Jordan–Palestine relations: Jordan has an embassy in Ramallah and a representative office in Gaza City.; Palestine has an embassy in Amman. |
| Qatar | | See Jordan–Qatar relations During the 2017 Qatar diplomatic crisis, Jordan downgraded diplomatic ties with Qatar. |
| Russia | | See Jordan–Russia relations Russia has an embassy in Amman, while Jordan has an embassy in Moscow. |
| Saudi Arabia | | See Jordan–Saudi Arabia relations: Jordan has an embassy in Riyadh and a consulate in Jeddah.; Saudi Arabia has an embassy in Amman. |
| South Korea | 26 July 1962 | See Jordan–South Korea relations Both countries established diplomatic relations on 26 July 1962: Jordan has an embassy in Seoul.; South Korean embassy in Amman. |
| Spain | | See Jordan–Spain relations: Jordan has an embassy in Madrid.; Spain has an embassy in Amman. |
| Syria | | See Jordan–Syria relations Relations between Jordan and Syria have fluctuated widely between normal diplomatic relations and full armed confrontation. At times, each side has attempted to subvert the other, and has supported and provided refuge to the other's internal opposition groups. |
| Turkey | | See Jordan–Turkey relations: Jordan has an embassy in Ankara.; Turkey has an embassy in Amman. |
| United Arab Emirates | | See Jordan–United Arab Emirates relations: The United Arab Emirates has an embassy in Amman.; Jordan maintains an embassy in Abu Dhabi and a consulate-general in Dubai. Both countries are part of the Middle East region and share close cultural ties.; Most notably, Princess Haya bint Al Hussein of Dubai is of Jordanian origin. |
| United Kingdom | 1946 | See Jordan–United Kingdom relations Jordanian King Abdullah II with British Prime Minister Keir Starmer in 10 Downing Street, November 2024. Jordan established diplomatic relations with the United Kingdom on 17 June 1946.: Jordan maintains an embassy in London.; The United Kingdom is accredited to Jordan through its embassy in Amman.; The UK governed Jordan from 1921 until 1946, when it achieved full independence. Both countries share common membership of the International Criminal Court, the United Nations, the World Health Organization, and the World Trade Organization. Bilaterally the two countries have an Association Agreement, a Development Partnership, a Double Taxation Convention, and a Strategic Partnership. |
| United States | | See Jordan–United States relations See also: Embassy of Jordan, Washington, D.C.; List of Jordanian ambassadors to the United States; and United States Ambassador to Jordan U.S. policy seeks to reinforce Jordan's commitment to peace, stability, and moderation.: Jordan has an embassy in Washington, DC.; United States has an embassy in Amman. |

== See also ==
- List of diplomatic missions in Jordan
- List of diplomatic missions of Jordan
- Visa requirements for Jordanian citizens
- Jordan–Netherlands relations
