= Holy See–Jordan relations =

Bilateral international relations

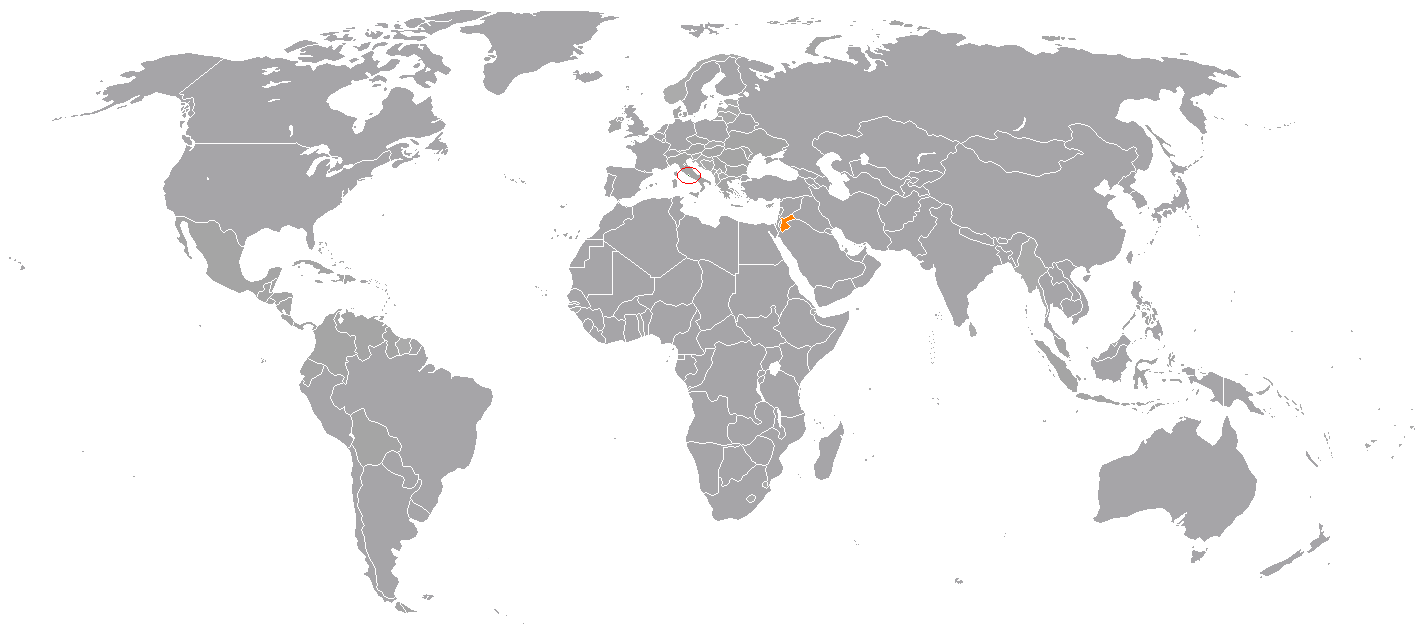

- Holy See: Jordan

Holy See–Jordan relations are foreign relations between the Holy See and Jordan. Both countries established diplomatic relations in 1994. The Holy See has a nunciature in Amman. Jordan has an embassy in Rome.

The Holy See has maintained comparatively good relations with Jordan. The name of the country comes from the Jordan River, which is significant to Christians because it was the location of the Baptism of Jesus by John the Baptist.

Various Christian clerics in the Arab world have a Jordanian background, such as Maroun Lahham in Tunisia and Fouad Twal in Israel/Palestine.

== Papal visits ==
Popes Paul VI, John Paul II and Benedict XVI have made visits to Jordan.

In 2009, Pope Benedict XVI made a visit to Jordan where he “ encouraged all Jordanians, whether Christian or Muslim, to build on the firm foundations of religious tolerance that enable the members of different communities to live together in peace and mutual respect. ... I want you to know that I hold in my heart the people of the Hashemite Kingdom and all who live throughout this region. ”

== See also ==
- Apostolic Nunciature to Jordan
- Foreign relations of the Holy See
- Foreign relations of Jordan
