= Jordan–Lebanon relations =

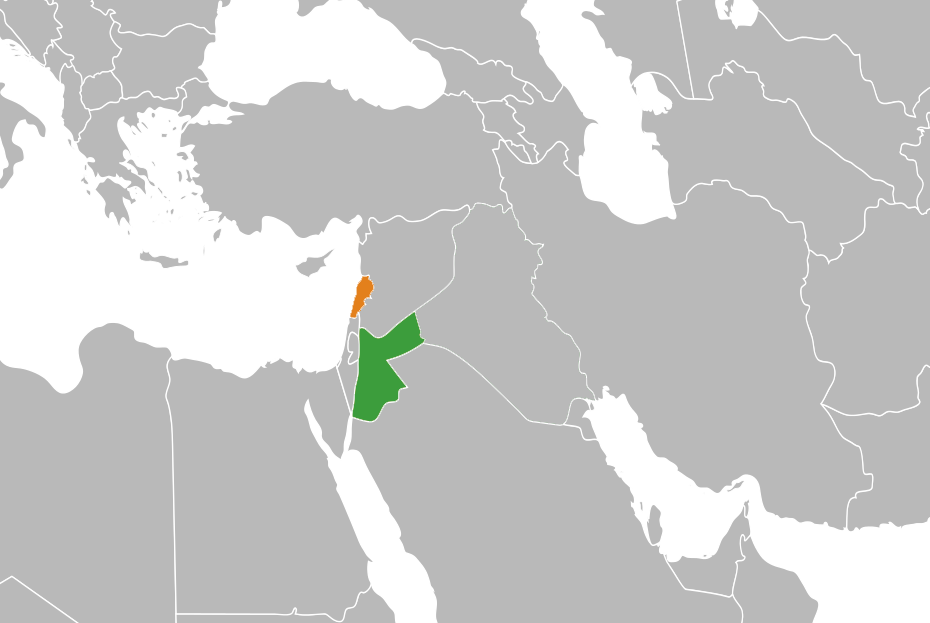

- Jordan: Lebanon

Jordanian–Lebanese relations are the relations between Jordan and Lebanon, two West Asia nations. Jordan has an embassy in Beirut and Lebanon has an embassy in Amman.

== History ==
Foreign Minister of Jordan Nasser Judeh and Prime Minister Tammam Salam address the Supporting Syria and the Region press conference, 4 February 2016

Lebanon and Jordan are two countries that lie in the Levant region and share extensively close cultural and historic ties. This common heritage between Jordan and Lebanon was eventually developed closer and more deeply by their connection to the Christian Bible and strong religious diversity in both countries. Both have been occupied by various outside powers, from the ancient Persian Empire in the east, to the Macedonian Empire and the Roman Empire, during the spread of the Arab Caliphate, and the adoption of Islam leading to further occupations by the Ottoman Empire. At the end of World War I, both countries were occupied by the British Empire and France; nonetheless their cultural ties remain unchanged.

Modern ties between Jordan and Lebanon renewed in the 20th century following the departure of the two European colonial powers. For most of their relationship, Jordan and Lebanon have shared cordial relations. In 1970 however, instability started in Jordan and Lebanon with the PLO and Jordanian Armed Forces fighting in Amman, culminating in the Black September event. Jordan was able to expel the PLO to Lebanon, but the Lebanese were not able to control the situation and soon it erupted into the Lebanese Civil War, which intensified sectarian conflicts within Lebanon. Jordan, on the other hand, during the unstable conditions in Lebanon, received a wave of mass investment, effectively transforming Jordan from a poor nation into one of the growing stable economies of the Middle East. After the end of Lebanese war in the 1990s, the two countries restored relations.

== Modern ties ==
Jordan and Lebanon maintain a strong and cordial relationship, with Lebanese prime minister Saad Hariri visiting Jordan in 2010.

The countries share common concerns over Syria amidst the Syrian Civil War, and Lebanon and Jordan host many Syrian refugees fleeing the country. Jordan and Lebanon also share a similar front against the Islamic State.

With both countries facing economic and political turmoils since 2017, this has created some wariness in pundits from neighbouring countries over the instabilities could arise in both nations.

In 2021, Jordan aims to help alleviate Lebanon's energy problem by supplying it with electricity with the help of Egypt and Syria. The deal was signed 26 January 2022.

On January 14, 2026 Jordan and Lebanon signed 21 cooperation agreements. In a meeting between Lebanese Prime Minister Nawaf Salam and Jordanian Prime Minister Jafar Hassan, they spoke about the historic ties between the countries, then signing the agreements covering issues such as: energy, trade, transport and public services.

== Military cooperation ==
Both nations cooperate heavily in the military aspect.

In 2015 The Jordanian army donated 30 APC and 12 M109.

In 2019, Jordan briefly deployed 2 helicopters to support the Lebanese army and civil defence in countering wildfires

In the aftermaths of the 2020 Beirut explosion, a Jordanian military field hospital was set up

Both militarizes alongside the US Navy participated in exercise Resolute Union 2021

== Resident diplomatic missions ==
- Jordan has an embassy in Beirut.
- Lebanon has an embassy in Amman.

== See also ==
- Foreign relations of Jordan
- Foreign relations of Lebanon
