= Egypt–Jordan relations =

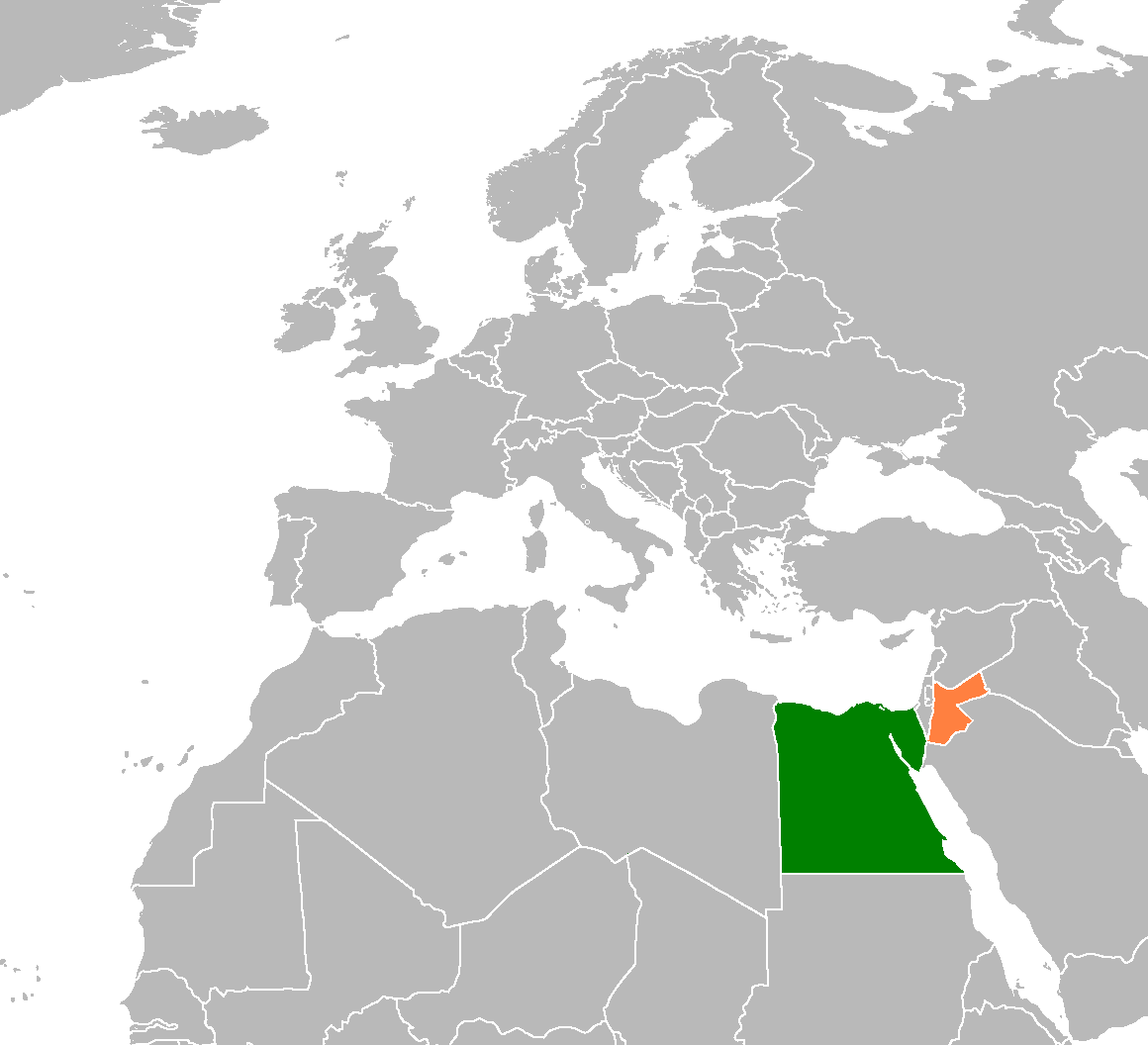

- Egypt: Jordan

Diplomatic mission
- Embassy of Egypt, Amman: Embassy of Jordan, Cairo

Envoy
- Mohammed Samir Marzouq: Amjad Adaileh

Egypt–Jordan relations refers to the bilateral relations between the Hashemite Kingdom of Jordan and the Arab Republic of Egypt. Egypt has an embassy in Amman, while Jordan has an embassy in Cairo.

Since independence, the two nations have maintained good relations. Both countries are members of the Arab League, GAFTA, the World Trade Organization, the Organisation of Islamic Cooperation, the Council of Arab Economic Unity and the United Nations. The relationship has been quite stable with some uncertainties occurring in the 1960s and 1970s. There is a sizeable Egyptian population living in Jordan of 636,000 which is one of the largest host of the Egyptian diaspora. There are approximately 12,000 Jordanians living in Egypt.

== History ==
The ties between Jordan and Egypt share a long history, stretching from the time of Pharaoh Akhenaten, whose writing mentioned areas in modern-day Jordan several times. Earliest records of trade dated back to the First Dynasty of Egypt, with Egyptian copper tools found in today's Jordan.

In April 2025, the Jordanian Ministry of Tourism announced the discovery of a hieroglyphic inscription featuring the royal cartouche of Egyptian warrior king Ramses III (1186 _1155 BCE) in Wadi Rum in southern Jordan, which refers to a military or a commercial campaign reflecting the ancient Egyptian influence in Jordan and the ancient relationship between the two countries.

Afterwards, Egypt and Jordan both came under the control of Nabataeans, Arabia Petraea of the Roman Empire, then Palaestina Salutaris of the Byzantine Empire. After the Muslim conquest of the Levant, both regions became part of the Ayyubid Dynasty, Fatimid Caliphate, Mamluk Sultanate, and finally Ottoman Empire.

Following the collapse of the Ottoman Empire, both Egypt and Jordan became under British rule, with the Sultanate of Egypt and Emirate of Transjordan respectively. During this time, the Palestine Railways had a line connecting the Sinai Peninsula with the East Bank. Israel captured most of those lines after the 1948 Arab-Israeli war.

== Political relations ==
=== Early cooperation ===
Diplomatic relations between the Egyptian and Jordanian government have existed since Jordan became independent in 1946. A year later, both countries jointly fought against Israel in the 1948 Arab–Israeli War. After the war, Jordan and Egypt each administered a part of Palestine, with Jordan controlling the West Bank and Egypt controlling the Gaza Strip.

In 1967, the two governments signed a defense agreement, preparing for the Six Day War that broke out just a few days later. Following the war, Israel captured both the West Bank and the Gaza Strip, ending Egypt and Jordan's administrations.

=== Diplomatic disagreements ===
Despite some cooperation, Jordan and Egypt remain somewhat distant in their diplomatic positions, as Jordan's position was closer to the Western Bloc, while Egypt under Gamal Nasser had more Ba'athist policies. In 1962, the two governments became distant as they supported opposing sides in the North Yemen civil war, despite Jordanian public support for Nasser. Following the Jordanian Civil War between the Jordanian government and the Palestinian Liberation Organization, Egypt played a mediating role between the two sides by hosting the 1970 Arab League summit. The assassination of Jordanian Prime Minister Wasfi Tal in 1971 also increased tensions, as Egyptian authorities did not prosecute the accused perpetrators after they appeared in an Egyptian court.

On April 6, 1972, the Egyptian government severed relations in protest for a Jordanian plan for federation with the West Bank, which did not take PLO interests into consideration. These relations were restored on September 11, 1973. They were severed again in 1979, this time by the Jordanian government, in protest of the Israeli-Egyptian peace treaty. Following the outbreak of the Lebanon War of 1982, the US government put pressure on both governments to reach accommodation for the purpose of formulating a joint peace strategy vis-a-vis the Israeli government, and relations were restored on September 25, 1984.

=== Improving relations ===
In 1989, the Arab Cooperation Council was founded, bringing Egypt and Jordan together and improving their relations. However, the Iraq invasion of Kuwait once again created tensions, as Egypt participated in the Coalition of the Gulf War, but Jordan was hesitant to fight against another Arab country.

Since the signing of the Egypt–Israel peace treaty in 1979, followed by the Israel–Jordan peace treaty and Oslo Accords in 1994, Egypt, Jordan, and the Palestinian Authority have been major players in resolving the Israeli–Palestinian conflict. This includes the Sharm El Sheikh Summit of 2005, and Egypt and Jordan have since become members of the "Axis of Arab Moderation" (محور الاعتدال العربي).

Following the 2011 Egyptian Revolution, Jordan was one of the first countries to recognize the leader Mohamed Morsi. Then after the 2013 Egyptian coup d'état, Jordan was also quick to recognize new leader Abdel Fattah al-Sisi.

In March 2021, the Prime ministers of the two countries signed seven agreements boosting the cooperation in many fields.

On 19 October 2023, Egyptian President Abdel Fattah al-Sisi met with King Abdullah II of Jordan in Cairo. They discussed the Gaza war and accused Israel of "collective punishment" and efforts to "displace Palestinians from their lands to Egypt or Jordan".

== Borders ==
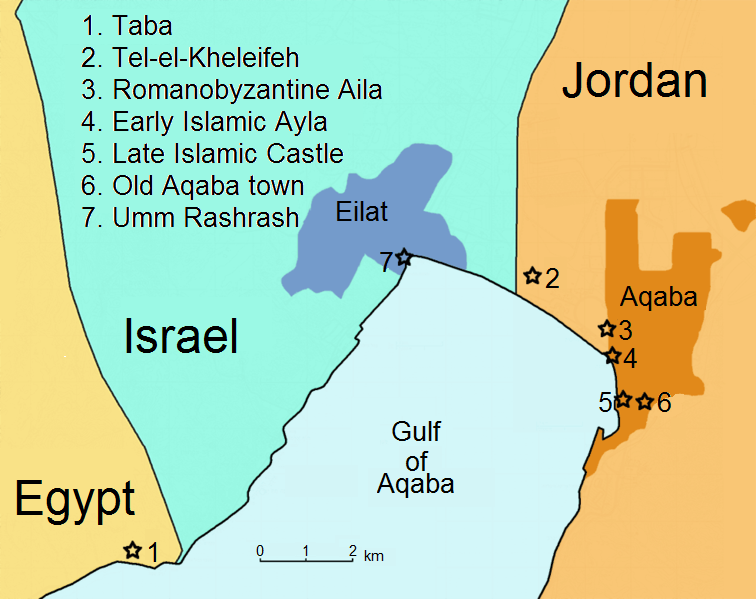
The close distance between Jordan's Aqaba and Egypt's Taba, separated by the Israeli city of Eilat

Egypt and Jordan do not share a land border, and are separated by the Gulf of Aqaba and the Negev Desert. However, the closest distance between the two countries is only 11 kilometres (6.8 mi), which is between Jordan's Aqaba and Egypt's Taba. The two cities are separated by the Israeli city of Eilat, which can be reached through the Wadi Araba Crossing and Taba Border Crossing respectively.

Both countries share an extensive border with Israel, with Jordan's measuring 335 kilometres (208 mi), (Note: 97 kilometres (60 mi) with the West Bank and 238 kilometres (148 mi) with Israel) while Egypt's is at 265 kilometres (165 mi). (Note: 11 kilometres (6.8 mi) with the Gaza Strip and 254 kilometres (158 mi) with Israel)

== Trade relations ==
Egypt and Jordan have several trade agreements, first with a bilateral trade agreement in 1998, then followed by participation in the Council of Arab Economic Unity and its Greater Arab Free Trade Agreement. In 2015, the trade volume between Egypt and Jordan stood at $656 million, down from $817 million in 2013. Among the agricultural products, Egyptian exports to Jordan include rice, potatoes, onions, guava, and mangoes, while Jordan mainly exports olive oil to Egypt.

In 2015, Jordanian investment in Egypt was estimated to be about $2 billion. For Egypt, it has investment in Jordan's science and technology, tourism, hotels, the Amman Stock Exchange, and the Cairo Amman Bank, amounting to about $1 billion. As of 2014, the joint investment between the two countries was valued at $850 million, with $500 million for Egypt and $350 million for Jordan.

=== Joint projects ===
In 1985, the governments of Egypt, Jordan and Iraq came together and established the Arab Bridge Maritime to facilitate passenger and cargo shipping in the region. This includes a shipping route between the Port of Aqaba in Jordan and the Nuweiba Port in Egypt, which transports about 1 million passengers annually and is a major cargo shipping route for trade. As of 2013, the company's capital is valued at about $100 million USD.

In 1996, the Egyptian and Jordanian governments agreed to establish Qualifying industrial zone in their countries to export to the United States without duties or tariffs as long as they contained inputs from Israel.

In 2004, Egypt and Jordan signed a 15-year agreement under the Arab Gas Pipeline to decrease Jordan's dependence on Egypt for natural gas, which makes up 80% of Jordan's electricity source.

Egypt was also supportive of Jordan seeking closer ties with the COMESA, which includes Egypt and many other African states.

In March 2025, Jordanian Minister of Labor and the Egyptian ambassador to Jordan met in Amman to discuss joint cooperation regarding labor affairs, in particular about Egyptians working in Jordan. They reiterated the importance of welcoming Egyptians to the country and protecting their rights under Jordanian law.

== Tourism ==
In 2009, there were about 150,000 Jordanians who visited Egypt. A major travel destination for Jordanians in Egypt is Sharm el-Sheikh, which is second only to Turkey. Conversely, many Egyptians travel to Jordan, most notably religious tourism for Egyptian Coptic Christians towards sites such as Al-Maghtas, which was the site of the baptism of Jesus.

== Cultural relations ==
Egypt and Jordan are bound by a common Arab culture and have frequent cultural exchanges, where Egyptian cities host Jordanian cultural events and Jordanian cities host Egyptian cultural events. These exchanges include academic workshops and training programs, and also include specialists in technical assistance from various fields. There are also frequent exchanges in musical performances, book fairs, visual arts, and exhibition of traditional crafts. For example, the city of Aqaba has influences from Egyptian culture due to contact with Egyptian fishermen and intermarriage.

The two countries have a strong educational partnership, and universities from both countries offer scholarships to foreign exchange students. Egyptian universities offer 10 free scholarships for medical school and 15 for postgraduate studies, while Jordanian universities offer 100 grants to Egyptian students every year, including 20 from public universities. In total, there are about 4,000 Jordanian students studying in Egypt, including 700 in advanced courses, while about 7,000 Egyptian students study in Jordan.

== See also ==
- Foreign relations of Egypt
- Foreign relations of Jordan
- Three-state solution
