= Jordan–South Korea relations =

- Jordan: South Korea

Diplomatic mission
- Embassy of Jordan, Seoul: Embassy of South Korea, Amman

Jordan–South Korea relations are the bilateral relations between Jordan and South Korea. Jordan has an embassy in Seoul. South Korea has an embassy in Amman.

== History ==
Diplomatic ties were established in July 1962, making Jordan one of the earliest Arab nations to forge relations with South Korea.

King of Jordan Hussein bin Talal visited Korea from September 10 to 13, 1983, the first time that a king of Jordan and a leader of a Middle Eastern nation visited Korea.

== Economic relations ==
Bilateral trade reached approximately 822 million US dollars in 2023, with Korean vehicles making up around 70% of exports to Jordan.

Despite this volume, Jordan’s share of imports from Korea is only 2.3%, and Jordanian exports to Korea are below 1%, signalling potential for growth as part of Jordan’s "Economic Modernization Vision 2023–2033".

Over ten major Korean companies operate in Jordan, including Samsung, LG, and KEPCO. KEPCO’s investments in Jordan’s power sector amount to more than1.48 billion US dollars, supplying around 17% of national electricity.

== Development cooperation and infrastructure ==
Since 1991, KOICA (Korea International Cooperation Agency) has provided around 362 million dollars in aid, focused on education, water resources, e-governance, and institutional capacity building.

Key achievements include:

Jordan-Korea Industrial School (JOKINS) in Zarqa and Jordan-Korea Institute for Technology (JOKOTI), training thousands of technicians and engineers.

KOICA’s investment in an $11 million Korea-Jordan Training Institute (KJIET) at the University of Jordan in Amman, delivering vocational training in AI, green energy, cybersecurity, and automation. Korean-led school construction and water network rehabilitation projects in Karak, Jerash, Mafraq, Irbid, and Zarqa.

== Political and security alignment ==
Jordan has acted as a consistent supporter of peace on the Korean Peninsula, including backing South Korea in anti-terrorism initiatives.

South Korea, in turn, invests in Jordan as a regional stabilizer and supports its humanitarian role for Syrian and Palestinian refugees, donating $3 – 4 million annually, plus $6 million through UNRWA.

Korea affirms a strong two-state solution approach for the Israeli–Palestinian conflict, highlighting Jordan’s constructive role.

== See also ==
- Foreign relations of Jordan
- Foreign relations of South Korea
- Arab foreign affairs
