= Jordan–Mexico relations =

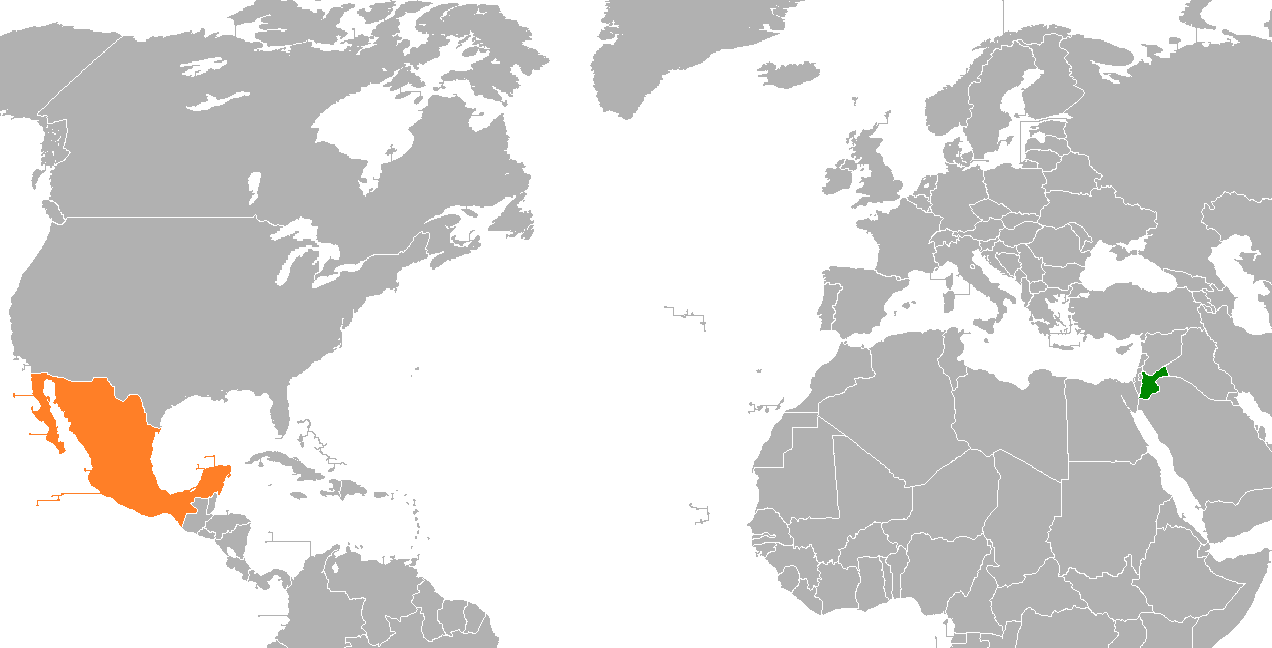

- Jordan: Mexico

The nations of Jordan and Mexico established diplomatic relations in 1975. Both nations are members of the United Nations.

== History ==
Diplomatic relations between Jordan and Mexico were established on 9 July 1975. One month later, Mexican President Luis Echeverría paid a state visit to Jordan. During the visit, he discussed with Jordanian King Hussein deepening of bilateral economic and trade relations and spoke about the issues affecting the Middle East at the time.

In June 2000, Mexican Foreign Secretary Rosario Green paid an official visit to Jordan. In September 2000, Mexican President Ernesto Zedillo met with King Abdullah II on the sidelines of the United Nations General Assembly session in New York City. In March 2002, King Abdullah II visited the northern Mexican city of Monterrey to attend the International Conference on Financing for Development summit. During his visit, he met with President Vicente Fox. In February 2014, King Abdullah paid a second visit to Mexico and met with President Enrique Peña Nieto. During the King's visit, memorandums were signed to increase cooperation in education and cultural exchanges; to increase technical and bilateral relations and to explore a free trade agreement.

In July 2014, Mexican Foreign Secretary José Antonio Meade paid a visit to Jordan and began negotiations on a free trade agreement with the country. During his visit, he announced that Mexico would open an embassy in the Jordanian capital. Foreign Secretary Meade also paid a visit to the Syrian refugee camp of Zaatari to observe the humanitarian crisis facing the refugees. In 2015, both Jordan and Mexico opened embassies in each other's capitals respectively.

In 2017, Princess Dina Mired of Jordan paid a visit to Mexico to attend the World Summit of Leaders Against Cancer. While in Mexico, Princess Dina met with President Enrique Peña Nieto.

In 2024, both nations celebrated 49 years of diplomatic relations.

== High-level visits ==
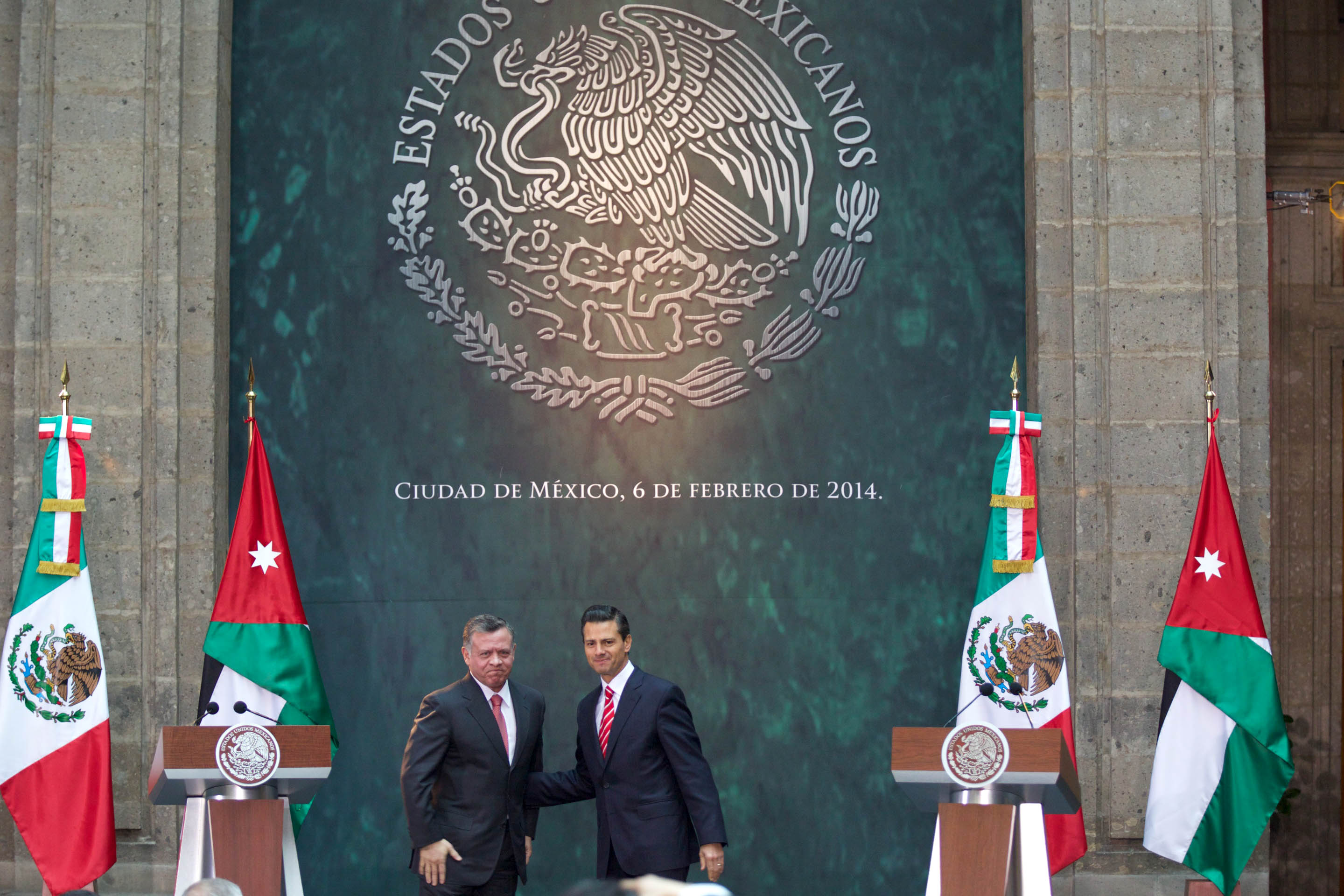
Jordanian King Abdullah II and Mexican President Enrique Peña Nieto in Mexico City; February 2014.

High-level from Jordan to Mexico

- King Abdullah II of Jordan (2002, 2014)
- Princess Dina Mired of Jordan (2017)

High-level visits from Mexico to Jordan

- President Luis Echeverría (1975)
- Foreign Minister Rosario Green (2000)
- Foreign Minister José Antonio Meade (2014)

== Bilateral agreements ==
Both nations have signed several bilateral agreements such as a Memorandum of Understanding between Mexico's Secretariat of Tourism and Jordan's Ministry of Tourism and Antiquities (2014); Agreement of Technical Cooperation (2014); Agreement on Educational and Cultural Cooperation (2014); Memorandum of Understanding for the Establishment of a Mechanism of Consultation in Matters of Mutual Interest (2015); Memorandum of Understanding and Cooperation between both nations Diplomatic Institutions (2015); and a Memorandum of Understanding between the Mexican-Arab Chamber of Commerce and Industry (CAMIC) and the Jordanian Business Association (JBA) (2018).

== Trade ==
In 2023, trade between Jordan and Mexico totaled US$68.4 million. Jordan's main exports to Mexico include: clothing articles, chemical based products, machinery, and parts and accessories for motor vehicles. Mexico's main exports to Jordan include: motor cars and other vehicles including tractors, telephones and mobile phones, chemical based products, containers for compressed liquified gas, instruments for medical appliances, pepper, vegetables, bread, chocolate, and alcohol.

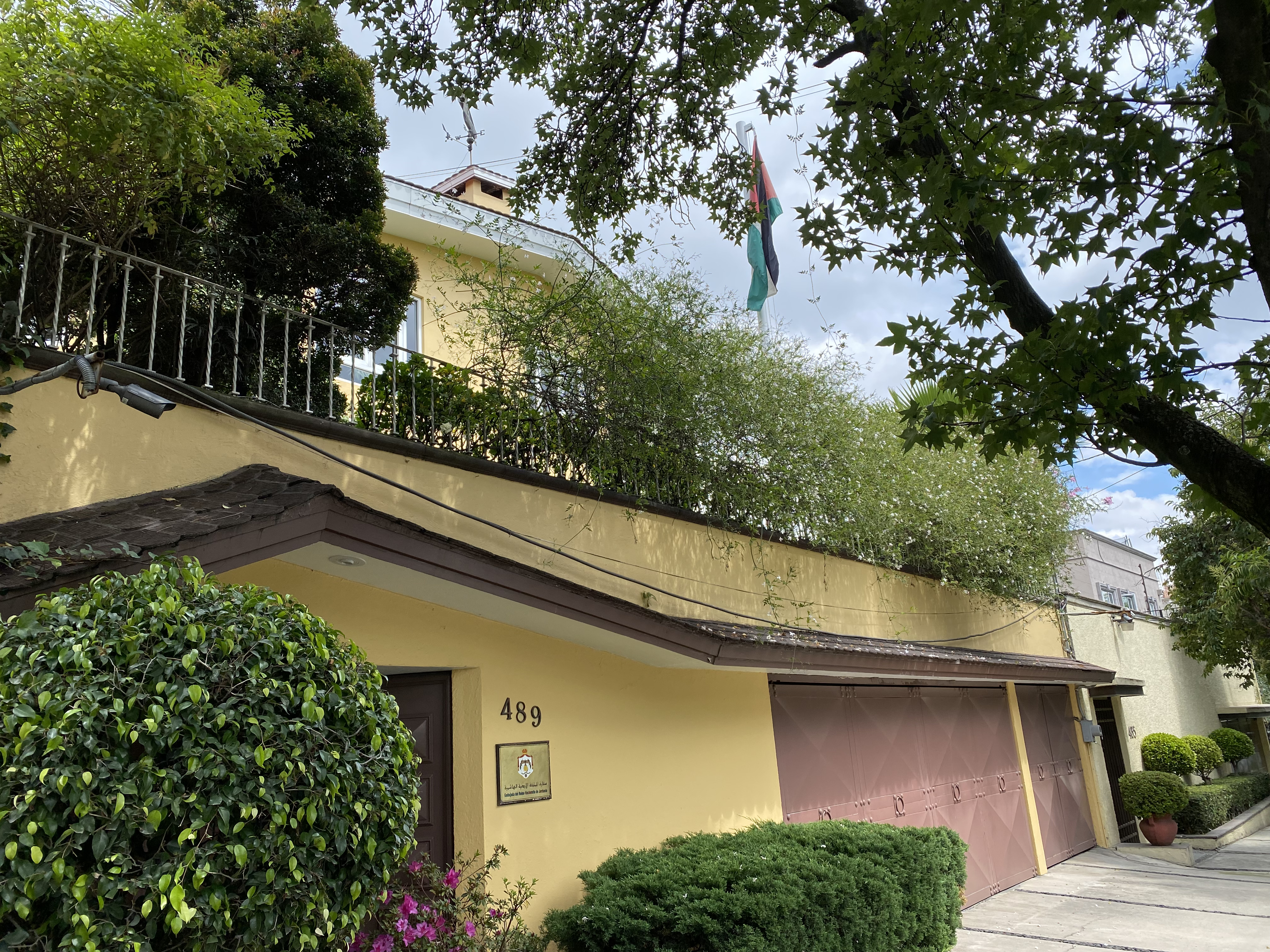
Embassy of Jordan in Mexico City

== Resident diplomatic missions ==
- Jordan has an embassy in Mexico City.
- Mexico has an embassy in Amman.

== See also ==
- Foreign relations of Jordan
- Foreign relations of Mexico
