= Jordan–Qatar relations =

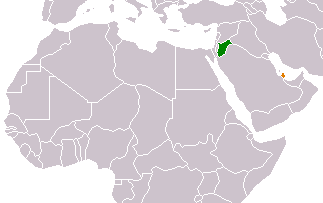

- Jordan: Qatar

Jordan–Qatar relations are the bilateral relations between the Hashemite Kingdom of Jordan and the State of Qatar. Diplomatic relations were established in 1972. Jordan has an embassy in Doha. Qatar also has an embassy in Amman.

== Diplomatic visits ==
Jordanian Prime Minister Faisal Al-Fayez visited Qatar in January 2004. During his visit, a number of economic and trade pacts were signed, including an agreement to avoid double taxation. In March 2004, Qatari Emir Hamad bin Khalifa Al-Thani visited Amman.

On 12 October 2021, King Abdullah II of Jordan visited Qatar's Emir Tamim bin Hamad Al Thani in Doha. They discussed bilateral relations, the developments in Syria and ways to reach "comprehensive peace" in the Israeli–Palestinian conflict. During the visit, investment contracts between the Qatar Investment Authority and Jordan's Government Investments Management Company (GIMC) were signed. On 25 January 2023, Sheikh Tamim received King Abdullah II for a working visit in Doha. They discussed bilateral relations, regional developments, as well as ways to expand cooperation in the fields of political, economic and investment relations between Jordan and Qatar.

== Political cooperation ==
=== Early cooperation ===
Although formal diplomatic relations date back to 1972, Qatari and Jordanian officials started cooperating a year earlier. When Qatar gained its independence in September 1971, it flew in Jordanian specialists to assist the new country in planning out its educational, military and economic sectors. In 1972, Qatar opened its embassy in Amman and its first ambassador to Jordan presented his credentials.

=== Detainment of Qatar Airways flight ===
Qatar had turbulent relations with Jordan in the early 2000s. In August 1999, Jordan banned the militant Palestinian Islamist group, Hamas. The then Hamas spokesperson in Jordan, Ibrahim Ghosheh was arrested and deported to Qatar in November 1999, along with several other Hamas members, where he lived freely. Jordan and Qatar became involved in a dispute over the matter. It was claimed by Qatar that it had temporarily agreed to host Ghosheh, along with 4 other imprisoned Hamas members, while it negotiated a settlement between the two parties.

On 14 June 2001, Ghosheh unexpectedly returned to Jordan on a Qatar Airways flight. Jordanian authorities grounded the flight he was on at Queen Alia International Airport. A standoff ensued, with the Qatari pilot refusing to leave with Ghosheh on the plane, and the Jordanian authorities refusing to release the flight without Ghosheh being present on the plane. One day into the standoff, Royal Jordanian Airlines froze all flights to Qatar. Two weeks into the stand-off, on 28 June, an agreement was reached between Jordan and Ghosheh in which Ghosheh would be flown to Bangkok and be allowed to return to Jordan if he "froze" his links to Hamas. Flights between the two countries were resumed on 30 June. On 16 July 2001, Qatar Airways announced it would be suing the Jordanian government for $2.2 million.

=== Imprisonment of Firas Majali ===
Authorities in Qatar arrested and tried a Jordanian journalist working for Qatar TV, Firas Majali, on charges of espionage in February 2002. A Qatari court ruled that Firas Majali be sentenced to death in October 2002, and maintained that ruling in February 2003. A month later in March, the Qatari emir granted Majali a pardon after meeting with King Abdullah II of Jordan.

=== 2002 closure of Al Jazeera ===
In August 2002, a segment broadcast by Al Jazeera was seen as being insulting to Jordan's ruling family, and in response, one day later Jordan closed Al Jazeera's bureau in the country and withdrew the accreditation of its journalists. Jordan also recalled its ambassador to Doha the same month. In 2003, Jordan reinstated Al Jazeera's Amman bureau.

=== 2006 United Nations elections ===
In response to Qatar's backing of Ban Ki-moon instead of Jordan's candidate Prince Zeid bin Ra'ad as the Secretary-General of the United Nations in the 2006 election, Jordan decided to withdraw its ambassador from Qatar. Although Qatar expressed its bewilderment of the situation, Jordan retaliated by claiming that all Arab League members had earlier agreed to support Jordan's candidate. Qatari Emir Hamad bin Khalifa Al-Thani accused Jordan of launching a media campaign to defame Qatar because of this incident.

=== Qatar diplomatic crisis ===
On June 6, 2017, one day after the beginning of the 2017 Qatari diplomatic crisis, Jordan announced that it would be cutting back ties with Qatar in solidarity with the blockading countries as well as shuttering the Al Jazeera bureau based there. After the decision was taken, Jordan came under pressure from its parliament to restore diplomatic relations at a normal level and to remain neutral in the conflict.

In July 2019, Jordan and Qatar restored diplomatic ties by appointing new ambassadors.

=== Humanitarian aid ===
During the COVID-19 pandemic, Qatar provided financial assistance to support COVID-19 vaccinations of Jordanians and Syrian refugees in Jordan. In 2020 and 2021, Qatar Fund for Development, Qatar Charity, and Qatar Red Crescent worked together with UNICEF to provide medical support, access to treatment, and safe water in the Zaatari refugee camp.

== Economic relations ==
In an attempt to promote direct investment by Qatar's government, Jordan set up a trade office in Doha in 2006. With Qatar's investments being valued at $2 billion in early 2018, it was the third-highest foreign investor in Jordan. These investments were mainly centered in Jordan's real estate and financial industries.

Trade turnover between the two countries was valued at $400 million in 2017. Qatar's main exports are chemicals and pharmaceutical products, while Jordan's chief exports are livestock, fruit and meat.

The economic ties between both the countries flourished in 2018 and 2019. The commercial exchange volume between Qatar and Jordan grew by 18% in 2018 to 1.3 billion Qatari riyals, compared with 1.1 billion Qatari riyals in 2017. By the end of the first nine months of 2019, 175 new Jordanian companies had established partnerships and alliances with Qatari firms.

On 14 March 2022, Jordan Civil Aviation Regulatory Commission and Qatar Civil Aviation Authority (CAA) signed an agreement on air services connecting Jordan companies and Qatar Airways to more global destinations.

In 2023, Qatari investments in Jordan reached US$ 4.5 billion.

== Educational relations ==
Qatar's Supreme Education Council and Jordan's Ministry of Education collaborate with each other by jointly participating in conferences, seminars and competitions. Furthermore, exceptional Jordanian students are granted scholarships to attend Qatar University.

The Jordanian School, located in the Ain Khaled area of Qatar's Al Rayyan, follows the Jordanian curriculum and caters to students from KG to 11th grade. In 12th grade, students attend a public school in order to attain a Qatari secondary school certificate.

== Migration ==
There were roughly 40,000 Jordanian citizens living in Qatar as of 2014.

== Jordan Embassy ==
The Jordan embassy is located in Doha.

- Ambassador Zaid Al Louzi

== Qatari Embassy ==
The Qatari embassy is located in Amman.

- Ambassador Saud Bin Nasser Al-Thani

== See also ==
- Foreign relations of Jordan
- Foreign relations of Qatar
