= Jordan–Portugal relations =

Bilateral relations

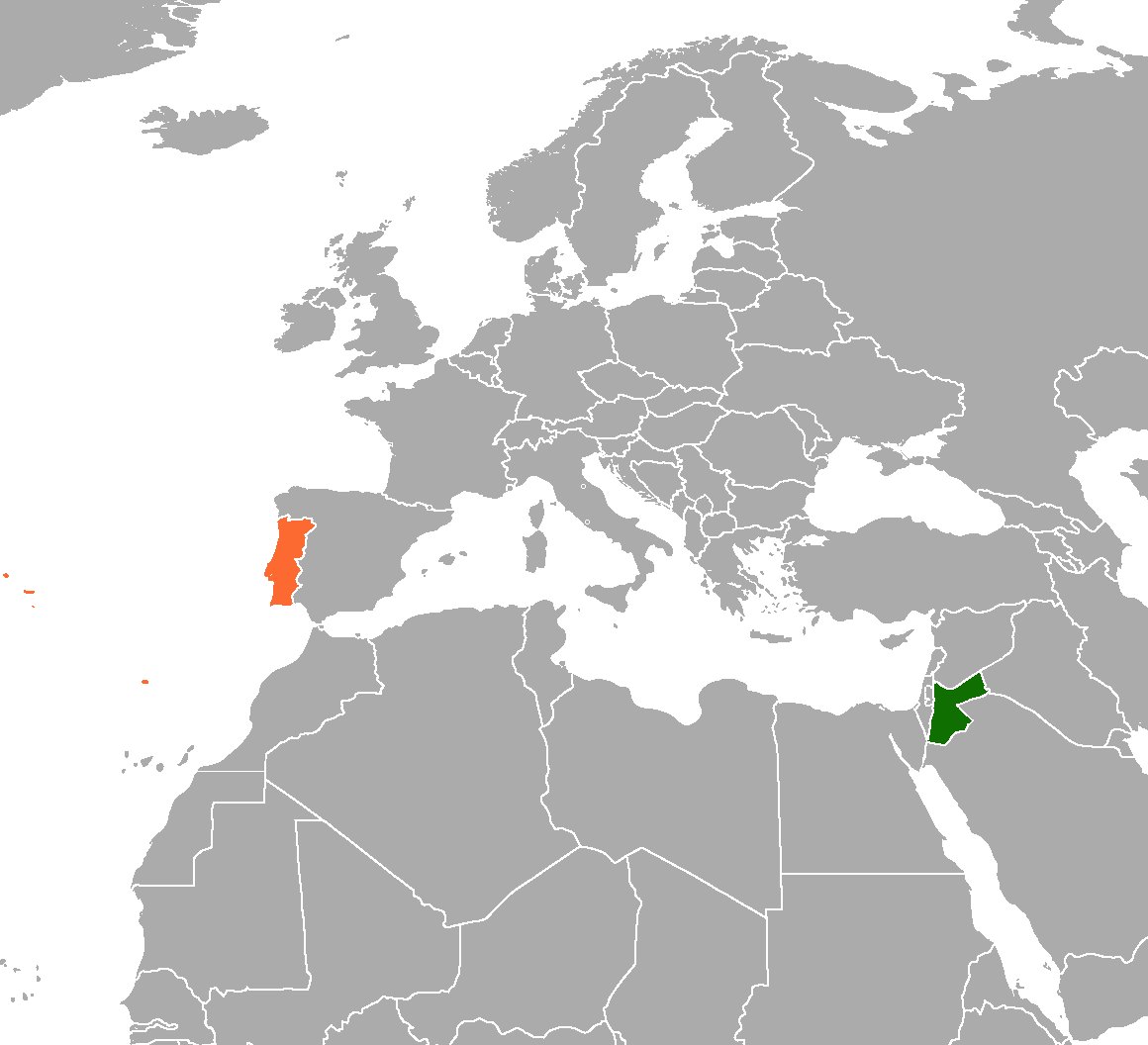

- Jordan: Portugal

Jordan–Portugal relations refer to the bilateral relations between Jordan and Portugal. The diplomatic relations between the two countries date back to June 1972, the month in which the first diplomatic mission is accredited in Jordan.

== History ==
The diplomatic relations between Portugal and Jordan were established in July 1972, and in the 5th of the same month, the Portuguese Ambassador in Beirut, Augusto Henrique Coelho Lopes, presented his credentials as Non-resident Ambassador in Jordan, becoming the first Portuguese diplomatic representative accredited to the Kingdom of Jordan.

The relations between the two countries have remained stable, and intensified in the first decade of the 21st century, with the signing of several bilateral agreements, and with a number of official visits being carried out by officials from both countries, including a state visit by the Portuguese President, Aníbal Cavaco Silva in February 2008, and an Official Visit from the Kings of Jordan in March 2009.

== Bilateral agreements ==
Several agreements have been signed between the two nations, including:

- Commercial, Economic and Technical Cooperation Agreement, 13 May 1980
- Tourism Agreement, 13 May 1980
- Agreement on Economic Cooperation, 17 February 2008
- Agreement for Cooperation in the Field of Tourism, 17 February 2008
- Agreement for Cooperation in the Fields of Education, Science, Technology and Higher Education, Culture, Youth, Sports and Media, 16 March 2009
- Memorandum of Understanding on Political Consultations, 16 March 2009
- Agreement on the Reciprocal Promotion and Protection of Investments, 17 March 2009

== High-level visits ==
Several high-level visits took place, including the following:

=== Visits from Portuguese officials to Jordan ===
- 21 August 2006, Luís Amado, Minister of State and Foreign Affairs
- 16–18 February 2008, Aníbal Cavaco Silva, President of the Portuguese Republic
- 14 May 2009, Luís Amado, Minister of State and Foreign Affairs
- 27 February 2011, Luís Amado, Minister of State and Foreign Affairs

=== Visits from Jordanian officials to Portugal ===
- March 16, 2009, Abdullah II, King of Jordan
- May 27, 2021, Ayman Safadi, Minister of Foreign Affairs

== Economic relations ==
The Economic relations between the two countries have intensified over the past decades, and in the period between 1995 and 2019, the exports of Portugal to Jordan have increased at an annualized rate of 2.96%, from $22.5M in 1995 to $45.3M in 2019, while in the same period, the exports of Jordan to Portugal have increased at an annualized rate of 6.21%, from $4.1M in 1995 to $17.4M in 2019. In 2019, Jordan was the 63rd largest client of Portuguese exports, and was the destination of 0.1% of the total Portuguese exports, while in the same year they occupied the 104th place in terms of exporters to Portugal, with a quota of 0.01% of the total.

In 2020, Portugal exported 47.1 million dollars' worth of goods to Jordan. The main products that Portugal exported to Jordan are included in the groups of Paper Goods, Chemical Products and Vegetable Products. On the other hand, Jordan exported to Portugal 11.7 million dollars, in the same year, with 98.9% of those goods being Chemical Products.

== Diplomatic missions ==
Neither country has permanent diplomatic missions in the other's territory.

Portugal's representation in Jordan is assured by the Portuguese Embassy in Cairo. Portugal has 1 Honorary Consulate in Amman, the capital of Jordan.

Jordan's representation in Portugal is assured by the Jordanian Embassy in Bern.

== See also ==
- Foreign relations of Jordan
- Foreign relations of Portugal
