= Jordan–Malaysia relations =

- Jordan: Malaysia

Jordan–Malaysia relations refers to bilateral foreign relations between Jordan and Malaysia. Jordan has an embassy in Kuala Lumpur, and Malaysia has an embassy in Amman. Relations between the two countries are mainly in economic co-operation.

== Economic relations ==
Currently both countries are working closely especially on the Islamic affairs. In oil project, Malaysia YTL Power has acquired a 30% stake on oil shale project in Jordan. Other Malaysian companies also has started to expand halal food business in Jordan by building a factory and supply the Royal Jordanian Army with halal food. On the other side, Jordan has revived a regular flight service to Malaysia, and the country has invested for a construction of a new international financial district. Jordan also plans to set up a branch of Al al-Bayt University in Malaysia. Both countries have signed an agreement on avoidance of tax. During the Mavi Marmara incident, Jordan also help to bringing any Malaysians detained earlier out of Israel.
