= Germany–Jordan relations =

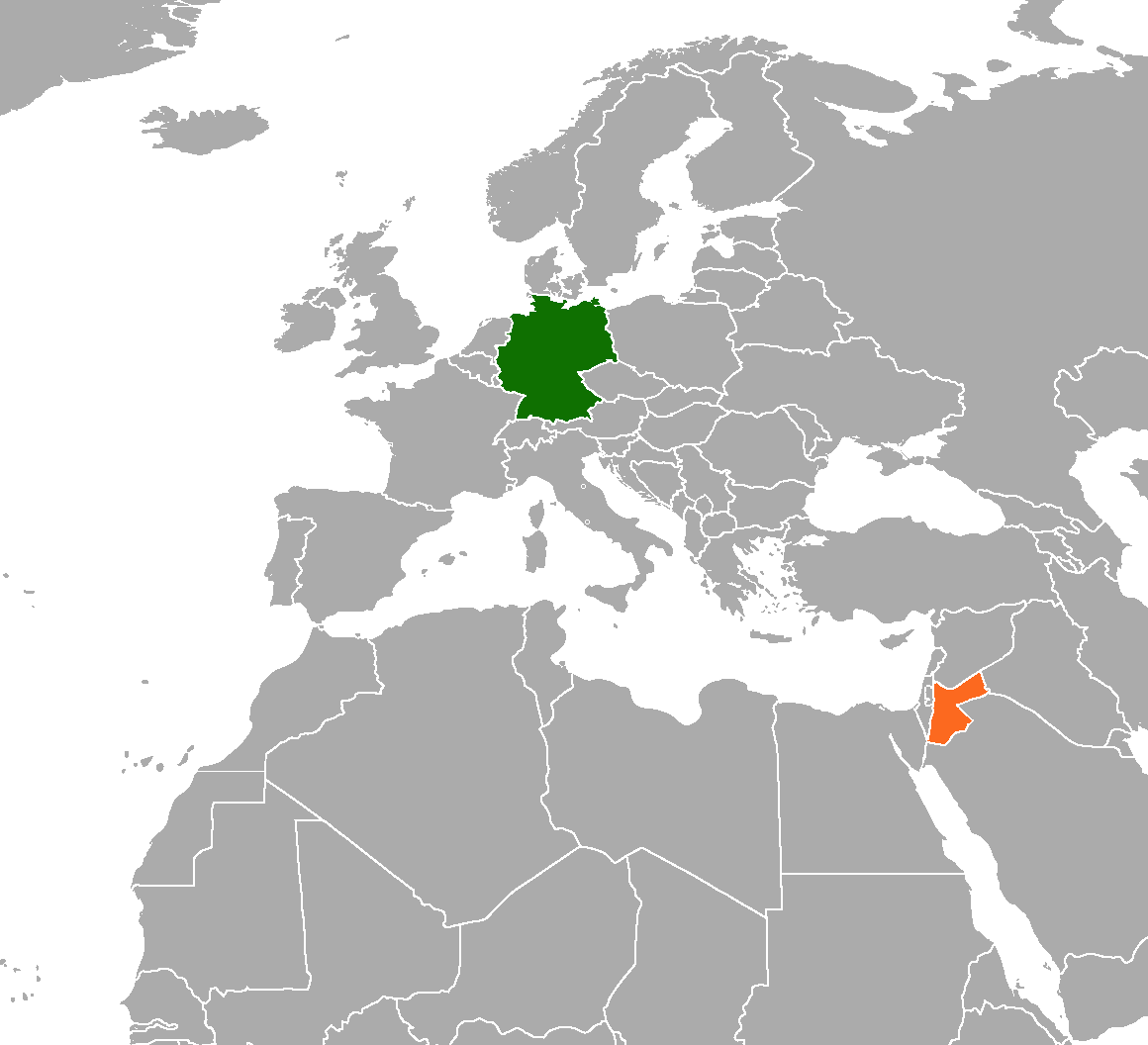

- Germany: Jordan

Germany–Jordan relations are described by the Federal Foreign Office as having been "close and friendly for a long time". Germany is one of Jordan's most important partner countries, with intensive political and economic relations.

== History ==
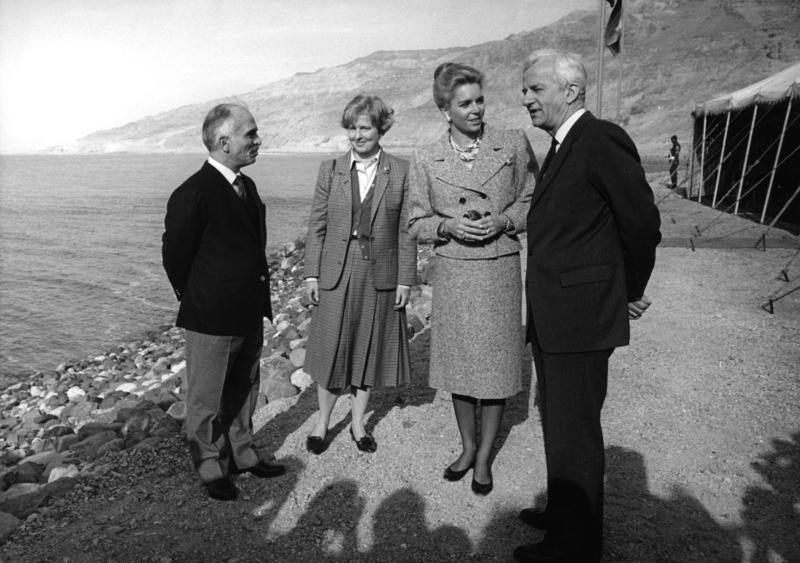
Richard von Weizsäcker in Jordan (1985)

Official diplomatic relations between Jordan and the Federal Republic of Germany (West Germany) were established in November 1953. Six years later, the German legation in Amman was transformed into an embassy. After the establishment of diplomatic relations with Israel on the part of the Federal Republic, Jordan and other Arab countries broke off diplomatic relations with West Germany. Two years later, however, bilateral relations between the two countries were resumed, and a Jordanian embassy was established in Bonn. After the end of the Hallstein Doctrine on the part of the Federal Republic under Chancellor Willy Brandt, Jordan also established official relations with the German Democratic Republic (East Germany) in October 1973. The GDR ambassadors in Damascus (Syria) were also accredited in Amman.

Relations between Jordan and reunified Germany expanded with the Israel–Jordan peace treaty in 1994 and the coming to power of Abdullah II in 1999, who pursued a relatively pro-Western policy. In 2000, Jordan moved its embassy in Germany from Bonn to Berlin. Monarch Abdullah II met with German Chancellor Gerhard Schröder in 2001 and announced that Jordan was a "strong, loyal partner of Germany, the West and the entire world" and called on Germany to act as a mediator in the Middle East conflict. In turn, Chancellor Schröder described Jordan as a "stability factor" in the region and agreed to intensify bilateral relations.

With the start of the civil war in Syria in 2011, Jordan took in millions of Syrian Refugees, which led to increased cooperation with Germany on migration and higher aid payments from Germany. In 2016 Jordan became part of Germany's "rearmament initiative" and received increased military equipment from Germany. In 2017, Bundeswehr soldiers were stationed in Jordan as part of the anti-IS coalition. In 2020, diplomatic relations between the two countries became closer when both states jointly opposed an Israeli annexation of the West Bank.

== Economic relations ==
The total volume of trade between the two countries amounted to 687 million euros in 2021, putting Jordan in 90th place in the ranking of Germany's trading partners. For Jordan, Germany is one of the most important trade and economic partners. Germany imports from Jordan mainly clothing, raw materials and salt, and in return exports Vehicles, foodstuffs, chemical products and machinery to Jordan.

On June 19, 2025, Jordan's Ministry of Planning and International Cooperation signed three agreements with German's Development Bank (KfW). These 35 million euros agreements will help small businesses around Jordan grow while focusing on more women being employed. The project was given the name: "Employment through Local Entrepreneurship," meant to support women entrepreneurs.

== Development cooperation ==
Germany is the second-largest bilateral donor of development aid to Jordan after the United States. In the 2010s, annual assistance (including loans) amounted to between 500 and 700 million euros. For 2021, aid of 483.69 million euros has been pledged for development projects. In addition to supporting international refugees in Jordan, the joint development partnership focuses on vocational training and employment as well as water supply, as Jordan is one of the most water-scarce countries in the world. The Deutsche Gesellschaft für Internationale Zusammenarbeit (GIZ) and the Kreditanstalt für Wiederaufbau (KfW) are active in Jordan. Projects in the country are also being implemented by the Federal Institute for Geosciences and Natural Resources (BGR) and the Physikalisch-Technische Bundesanstalt (PTB).

== Cultural relations ==
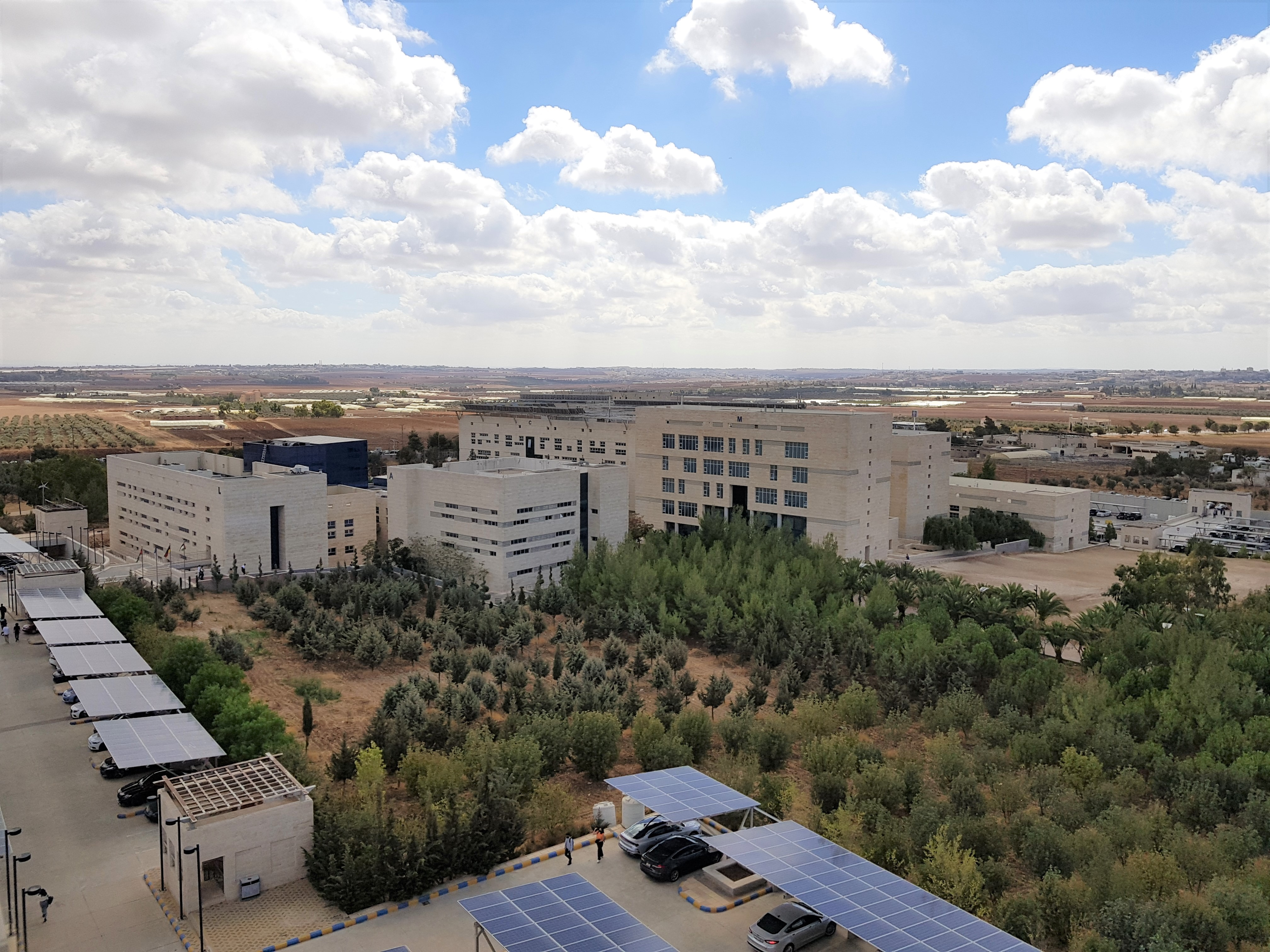
Madaba Campus, German Jordanian University

Founded in 1963 by the entrepreneur Kurt Uihlein, the German-Jordanian Society, headquartered in Hanover, serves as a registered association to promote cultural relations between the two countries. A cultural agreement for closer cooperation in the fields of education, research, media, art, and youth and sports was signed in 2004. In 2005, the German–Jordanian University was opened, which is based on the model of German universities of applied sciences and focuses on engineering and business administration. German as a foreign language is offered at several Jordanian schools through an initiative set up by the resident Goethe Institute. The German Academic Exchange Service is also active in the country. Close ties also exist in the field of archaeology, and the German Protestant Institute maintains a scientific branch in Jordan as a research unit of the German Archaeological Institute and is involved in excavations of historical cultural sites with local partners.

Several German political foundations are active in Jordan and participate in programs to promote civil society, gender equality, poverty reduction and political participation.

== Diplomatic missions ==
- Germany has an embassy in Amman.
- Jordan has an embassy in Berlin.
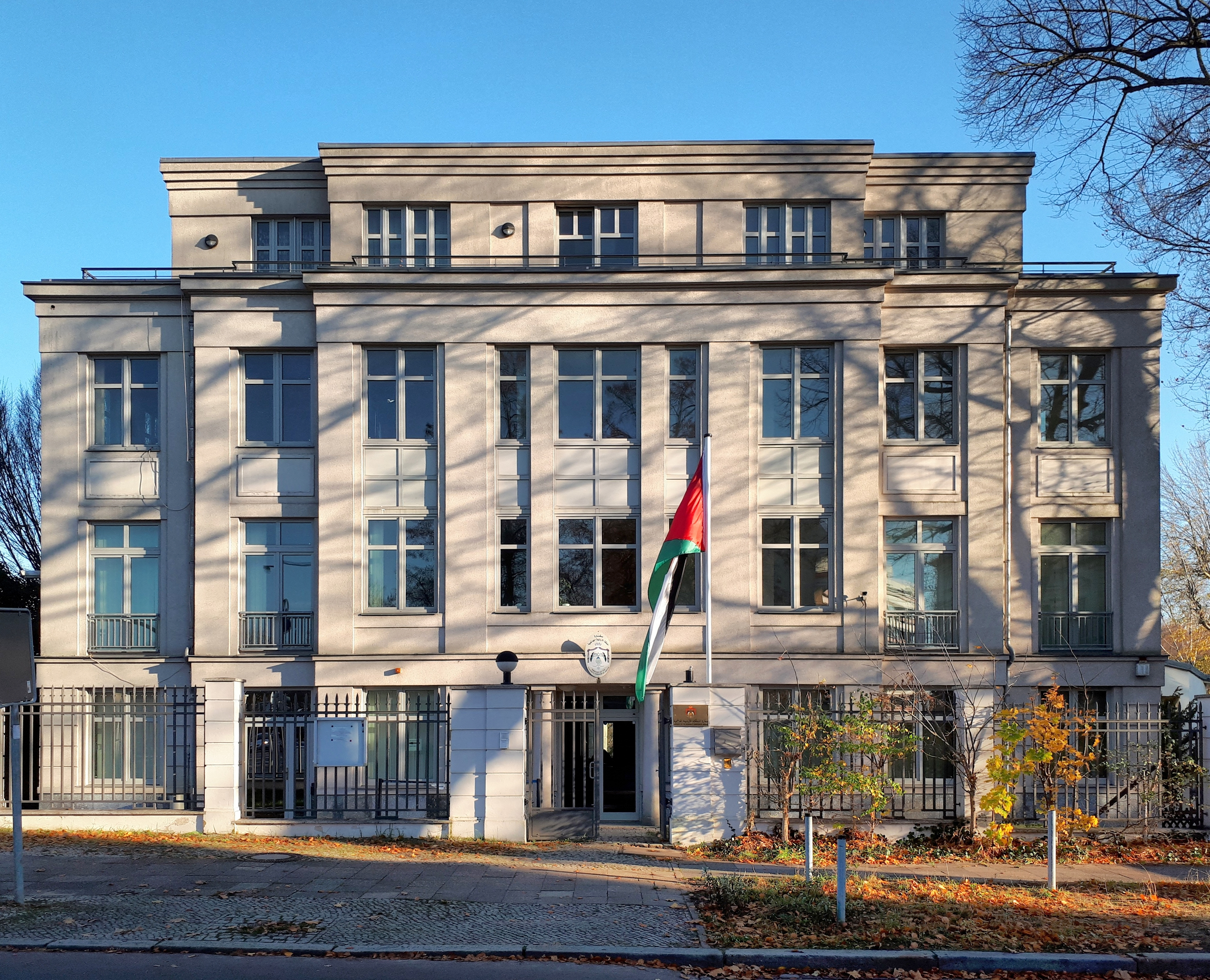
Jordanian embassy in Berlin

== See also ==
- Foreign relations of Germany
- Foreign relations of Jordan
