= Greece–Jordan relations =

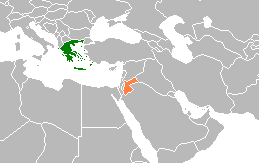

- Greece: Jordan

Greece–Jordan relations are foreign relations between Greece and Jordan. Greece has an embassy in Amman, while Jordan has an embassy in Athens and an honorary consulate in Thessaloniki. Both countries are members of the Union for the Mediterranean.

== History ==
The capital and largest city of Jordan, Amman, was founded by Greeks. It was named Philadelphia, back then. Many other cities were also founded by the Greeks, including Gadara, Jerash and Pella. In modern Jordan there were the Decapolis.

During the Antigonid–Nabataean confrontations, the Antigonus became aware of the wealth of the Nabataeans. However, the Nabataeans maintained their independence, then they managed to defeat the Seleucid Empire at the Battle of Cana in 84 BC.

In AD 106, the Nabataean Kingdom was annexed by the Roman Empire and renamed to Arabia Petraea, which later became part of the Byzantine Empire until 630s. In Jordan there are many Early Byzantine mosaics, some inscribed in Greek, including the famous Madaba Map.

During the COVID-19 pandemic, Greece donated 150,000 vaccines to Jordan.

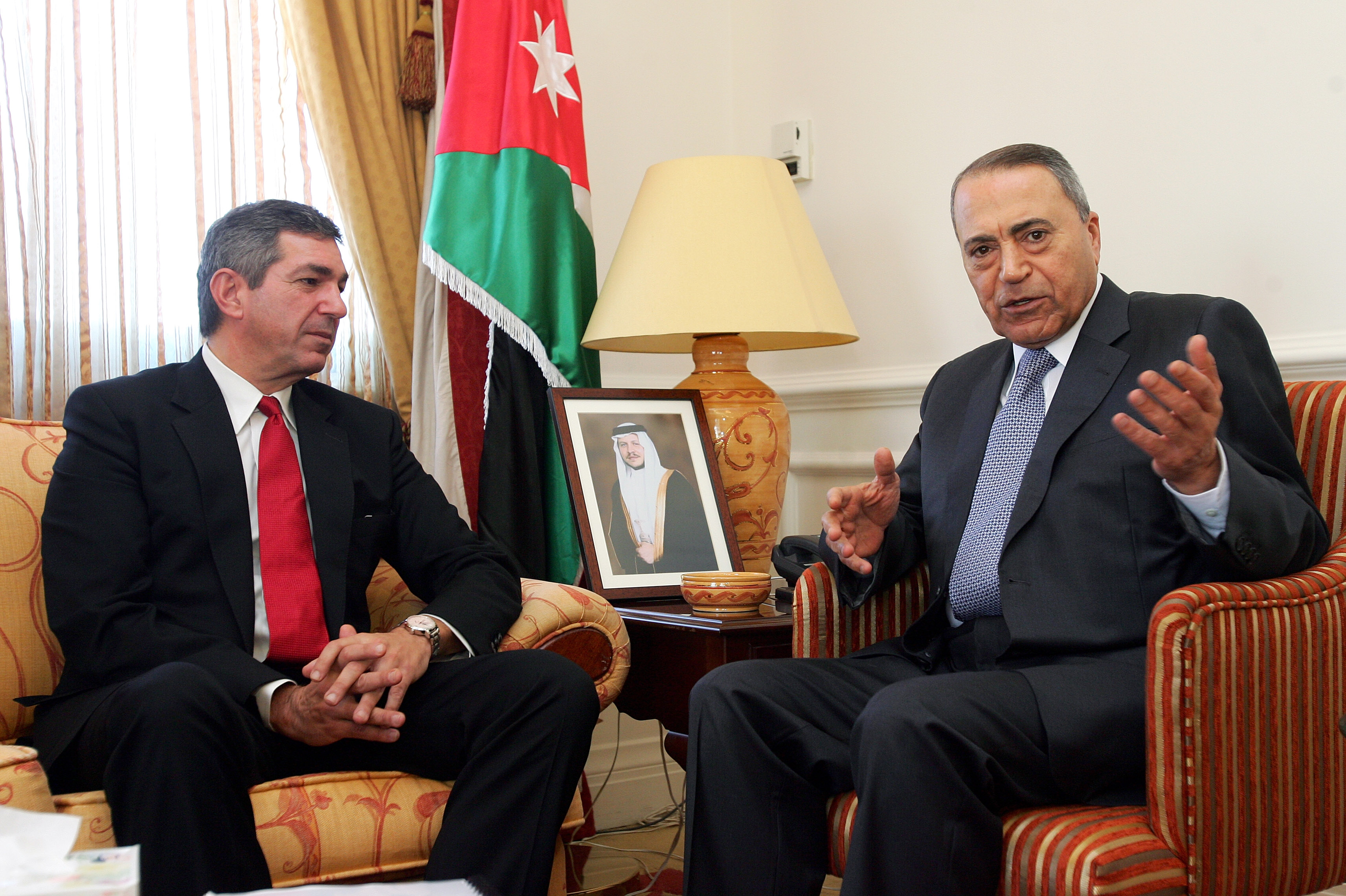
Greek Foreign Minister Stavros Lambrinidis meeting Jordanian Prime Minister Marouf al-Bakhit during his visit in Amman in October 2011

== Resident diplomatic missions ==
- Greece has an embassy in Amman.
- Jordan has an embassy in Athens.

== See also ==
- Foreign relations of Greece
- Foreign relations of Jordan
