= Jordan–Kuwait relations =

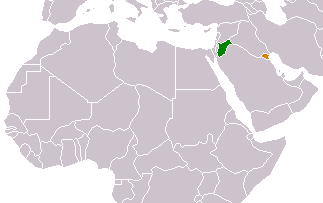

- Jordan: Kuwait

The bilateral relationship between Jordan and Kuwait is considered to be strong, though there are still sporadic tensions. Jordan has an embassy in Kuwait City, and Kuwait maintains an embassy in Amman.

== History ==
Both nations have Arab roots following the Arab conquests, shared history under the Ottoman Empire, and maintain a close relationship. The two nations are also strongly monarch countries. The two nations first established ties soon after Kuwait's independence. The former Prime Minister of Jordan, Omar Razzaz, called it an exemplary.

Throughout the Iran–Iraq War, Jordan, along with Kuwait, were two main backers of Iraq in the conflict against the Islamic regime in Iran. However, following the Gulf War, began with Iraqi invasions of Kuwait, Jordan had been accused of being silent to the plight of many Kuwaitis, including the royal family of Kuwait, Al-Sabah; nonetheless the Jordanians were able to keep balance in relations. After the end of the Gulf War, Jordan became more critical of Saddam Hussein and more sympathetic to Kuwait. Both two countries showed concerns over the blockade of Qatar during the Qatar diplomatic crisis.

== Current ==
The two nations, since the end of the Gulf War, have enjoyed a new era of cooperation. In 2019, Jordan and Kuwait signed 15 agreements to boost the cooperation in every field.

During the 2022 World Cup qualification, with Jordan and Kuwait share similar group, Jordanian supporters were found to have chanted Saddam Hussein, in reference to the Iraqi dictator who invaded Kuwait at 1990. The Kuwaiti government has criticized the chant, and urged the Jordanian government to investigate.

In September 2020, Jordan and the Kuwait Fund for Arab Economic Development (KFAED) signed two development aid agreements worth US$89 million to finance public education, infrastructure and economic reforms in Jordan.

In March 2026, following the continuance of the 2026 Iran war, Jordan's Foreign Minister Ayman Safadi held a phone call with Kuwait's Foreign Minister Sheikh Jarrah Jaber Al‑Ahmad Al‑Sabah, during which both officials strongly condemned Iranian attacks targeting Jordan, Kuwait, and other Arab Gulf states. They discussed the escalating regional tensions and emphasized the need for diplomatic efforts to restore calm, protect state sovereignty, and maintain regional security and stability.

== Ambassadors ==
The current Jordanian ambassador to Kuwait is Saqr Abu Shatal. The current Kuwaiti ambassador to Jordan is Aziz Dihani.
