= Jordan–Netherlands relations =

- Jordan: Netherlands

Jordan–Netherlands relations are bilateral relations between the Hashemite Kingdom of Jordan and the Kingdom of the Netherlands. The diplomatic relations between the countries were established on 15 December 1951. Both countries maintain resident embassies in each other's capital.

== History ==
Formal relations between the two countries date back to 1951. Over the years they have expanded over issues such as water security, refugee response, and regional stability. The first state visit of Abdullah II and Queen Rania was in 2006, and in 2018 they paid an official visit to the Netherlands, invited by King Willem-Alexander. Queen Máxima paid an official working visit to Jordan in 2019, as part of her UN Special Advocate capacity, at the Jordanian government’s invitation. Jordan holds representation in the Netherlands as the Netherlands have an embassy located in Amman.

== Economic relations ==
In 2023, Jordan mainly sold potash fertilizers and knit clothes, including T-shirts, to the Netherlands. From 2023 to 2026, Dutch aid will focus on refugee support, jobs and business growth, and water and climate projects in water, farming, clean energy, and digital sectors. Most recently, the Netherlands signed a JD 31 million (about €40 million) deal to help build a desalination project in Aqaba and also promised €100 million for longer-term cooperation.

== Refugee and humanitarian support ==
A key feature in the relationship between the countries is, helping refugees and the communities that host them. They operate closely with UNICEF, UNHCR, ILO, IFC, and the World Bank, the Netherlands is giving over $98 million to improve jobs, education, and protection for refugees and vulnerable Jordanians. Dutch aid also backs gender equality, youth empowerment, and local incomes through programs like Shiraka and Orange Corners.

== Defense and security cooperation ==
The military cooperation between both countries has grown over the years. The 2025 cooperation agreement between the Jordanian Armed Forces (JAF) and the Dutch Armed Forces, is set to enhance training, technical exchanges, and peacekeeping coordination. They also agreed on counter-terrorism and regional humanitarian security.

== Legal and investment frameworks ==
The two countries have an investment treaty from 1997 that took effect in 1998. Tax issues are covered by separate tax agreements under each country’s own treaty network.

== See also ==
- Foreign relations of Jordan
- Foreign relations of the Netherlands
