= Jordan–Spain relations =

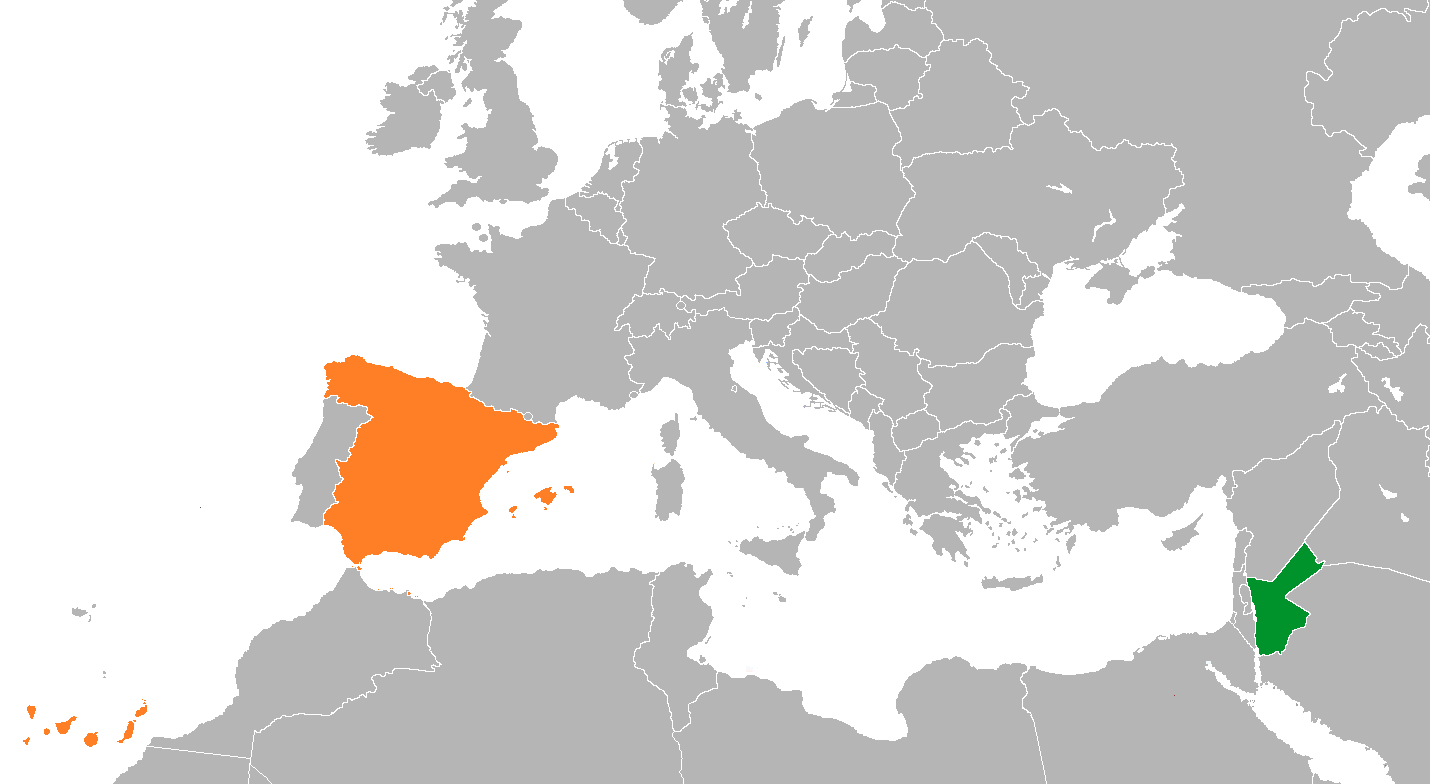

- Jordan: Spain

Jordan–Spain relations are the bilateral and diplomatic relations between these two countries. Jordan has an embassy in Madrid and two consulates in Barcelona and Bilbao. Spain has an embassy in Amman.

== Diplomatic relations ==
Spain and Jordan share historical ties and political, economic and cultural interests. Hispanic-Jordanian relations have traditionally been very close and are characterized both by the absence of bilateral disputes and by the confluence of positions in regional political affairs (Middle East Peace Process, Barcelona Process, Mediterranean Dialogue, UPM, NATO, etc. .) and international (initiatives against hunger and poverty, Millennium Goals, United Nations reform, Alliance of Civilizations, etc.). The links between the Spanish and Jordanian royal families have contributed prominently to this approach, which has a solid social, cultural, political and economic basis.

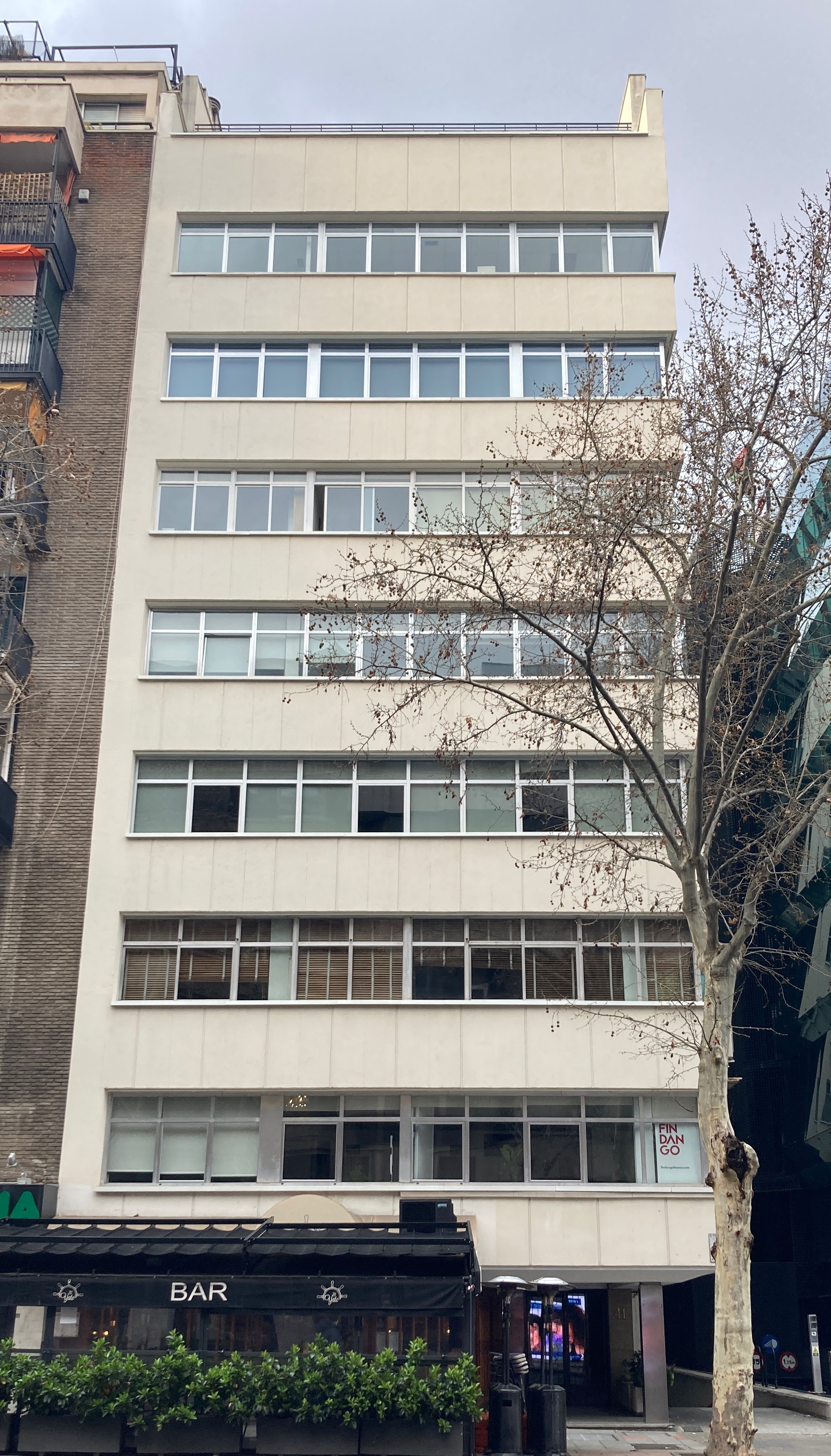
Embassy of Jordan in Madrid

== Economic relations ==
The flow of Jordan's gross investments in Spain in 2013 and 2014 amounts to 29M euros. The flow of gross investments of Spain in Jordan in 2013 and 2014 amounts to 2M euros. The main commercial operations carried out include: CASA. At the end of March 2010, the sale of two airplanes for € 19m was completed TELVENT (ABENGOA Group). In 2010, it signed a commercial contract to carry out a SCADA project for North Amman, for €12 million in the FIEM / SME line.

== Cooperation ==
=== From the Spanish government ===
The Technical Cooperation Office (La Oficina Técnica de Cooperación; OTC) resident in Amman, which covers Jordan, Syria and Lebanon in accordance with its creation regulations, opened its doors at the end of 2008. It has an administrative unit and a person in charge of humanitarian projects . The permanence of the Technical Cooperation Office of Amman has been consolidated with the appointment of a general coordinator, due to the humanitarian dimension of its activity. From Amman, the help that the Office of Humanitarian Action of the AECID goes to Jordan, Syria, Lebanon, Turkey and Iraq is channeled to alleviate the humanitarian needs arising from the conflict in Syria and Iraq.

The current cooperation focuses on supporting the resolution of the crisis caused by the large number of refugees in the country as a result of the war in Syria, and activities carried out under the “Masar” program to accompany the democratizing processes in Middle East and North Africa.

In 2014, the project to strengthen the capacities of the Ministry of Social Development to prevent and respond to gender-based violence was completed.

In August 2015, the Tahdir-Masar initiative was approved for the Syrian civilian population, co-financed by the EU, which makes the maintenance of the OTC essential. Its objective is to train people with the potential to become key actors in a future transition and prepare for recovery. It will be carried out together with three Jordanian organizations and support from the Jordanian Ministry of Interior.

=== Of the CC.AA. ===
Decentralized cooperation in Jordan has been significantly reduced in 2014.

=== NGOs (cooperators and volunteers) ===
In 2014, regional agreements and other projects by NGOs have continued to be implemented: Movement for Peace, Disarmament and Freedom (MPDL), International Solidarity (SI), Foundation for the Social Promotion of Culture (FPSC), and Rescue and Conemund.

Within the framework of the Masar program, the project to strengthen the emerging civil society to contribute to the democratic governance processes in Jordan, Palestinian Territories, is being implemented in 2014. Lebanon, Tunisia and Egypt, executed through Foundation for the Future.

=== Mixed cooperation commissions ===
The last Mixed Commission was signed in Amman on 29 April 2006 and in 2010 an Operational Programming exercise was carried out, to systematize better the interventions of the Spanish Cooperation.

The cooperation has continued its activities with the identification, formulation and execution of proposals to face the humanitarian crisis caused by the increase in Syrian refugees and to support the processes of democratic reform, a framework in which the Masar program intervenes, with whose funding they have executed several projects throughout 2013 and 2014.

== Resident diplomatic missions ==
- Jordan has an embassy in Madrid.
- Spain has an embassy in Amman.

== See also ==
- Foreign relations of Jordan
- Foreign relations of Spain
