= Jordan–Russia relations =

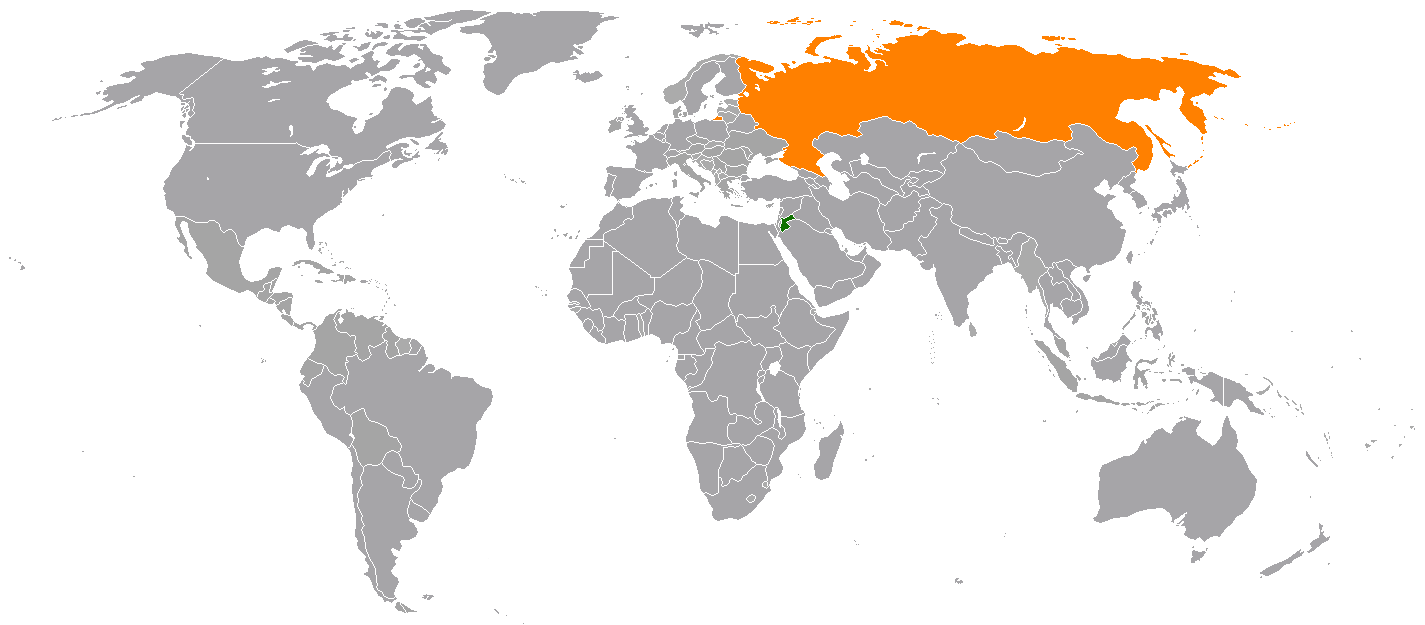

- Jordan: Russia

Diplomatic mission
- Russia Embassy, Amman: Jordan Embassy, Moscow

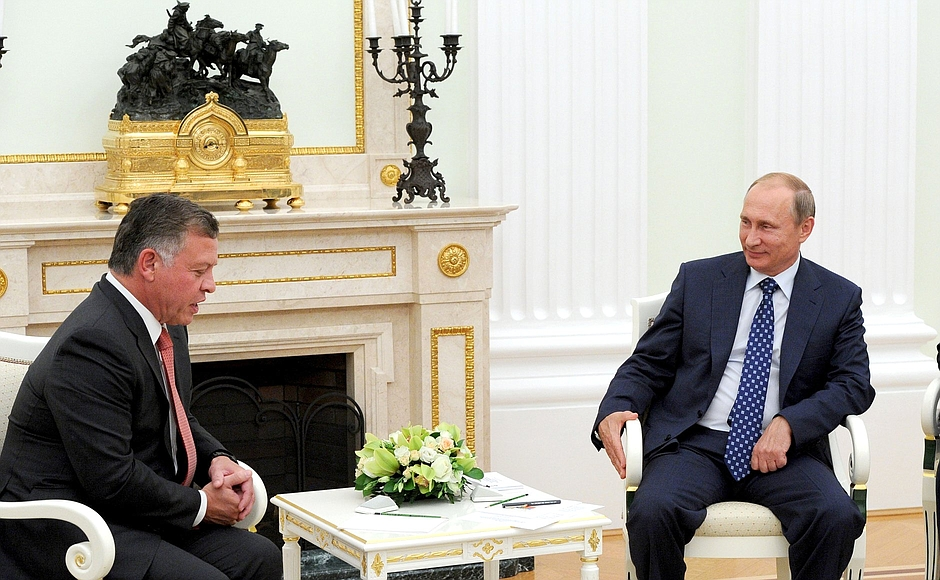
Putin and Abdullah II at the Grand Kremlin Palace, August 2015

Jordan–Russia relations (Russian: Российско-иорданские отношения) are foreign relations between Russia and Jordan. Russia has an embassy in Amman, while Jordan has an embassy in Moscow. Both countries established diplomatic relations on August 20, 1963.

Today, relations between both countries are very strong and friendly. Russian Presidents Vladimir Putin and Dmitry Medvedev have visited Jordan several times and have met with Jordanian King Abdullah II.

In mid June 2025 Jordan and Russia signed a visa-free travel deal, letting their citizens visit each other for up to 30 days per trip, and 90 days per year, without needing a visa. This removes travel fees and paperwork. The goal is to boost tourism, strengthen ties, and support businesses like airlines and hotels in both countries.

== Russian Embassy ==
The Russian embassy is located in Amman.

- Ambassador Gleb Desyatnikov

== Jordan Embassy ==
The Jordan embassy is located in Moscow.

- Ambassador Khaled Shawabkeh

== See also ==
- List of ambassadors of Russia to Jordan
