= Second cabinet of Abdullah Ensour =

Government of Jordan from 2013 to 2016

- 77th Cabinet of Jordan

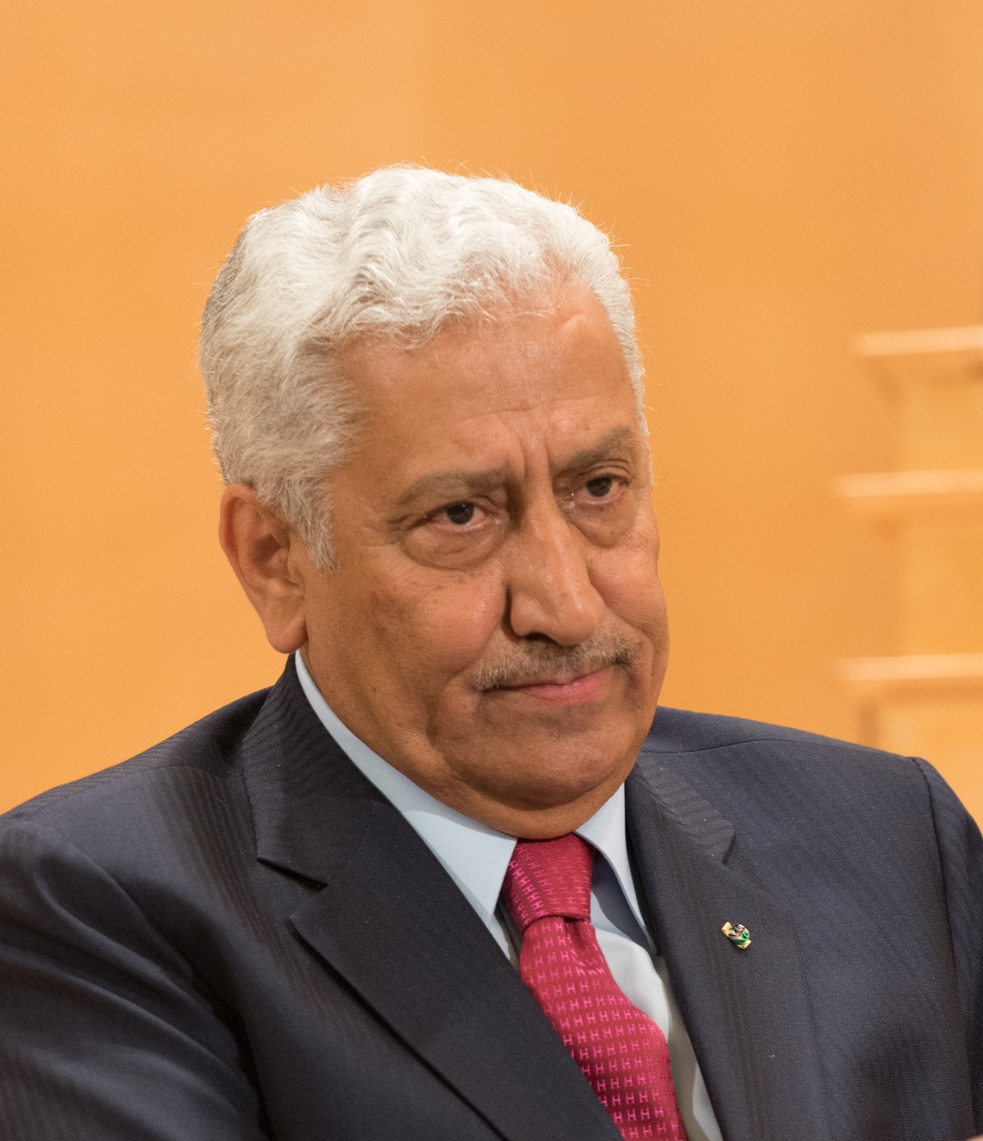
- Date formed: 23 April 2013
- Date dissolved: 1 June 2016

People and organisations
- Monarch: Abdullah II
- Prime Minister: Abdullah Ensour
- Member parties: Independent

History
- Election: 2013 general election
- Legislature term: 17th Parliament
- Predecessor: First Ensour Cabinet
- Successor: Mulki Cabinet

The prime minister of Jordan, Abdullah Ensour, formed his second cabinet in March 2013. The new cabinet was sworn in before King Abdullah II on 30 March 2013. On 23 April 2013, the parliament approved the cabinet with 83 votes in favor and 65 votes against.

It was the 77th government of Jordan. In addition, it was the thirteenth government formed during the reign of King Abdullah who ascended to the throne in 1999.

== Structure ==
The cabinet was initially made up of 19 members. The number of portfolios in the first cabinet of Ensour was 21.

Of the cabinet members excluding Ensour, four retained their previous posts in the first cabinet. Nine of the cabinet members are newcomers, while five served in other cabinets. There is only one woman in the cabinet, Reem Abu Hassan who was appointed minister of social development. None of the cabinet members are member of the parliament.

=== Reshuffles ===
On 21 August 2013, the cabinet was reshuffled and five ministers left office: Mohammad Wahsh (Education), Mohammad Qudah (Awqaf and Islamic affairs), Mujalli Mhailanm (Health), Malek Kabariti (Energy and mineral resources) and Barakat Awajan (Culture). In addition, the number of cabinet members was increased to 27.

A further reshuffle occurred 2 March 2015, with five new ministers joining the cabinet while four left. Imad Fakhoury was named minister of planning and international cooperation, Maha Ali Minister of Industry, Trade and Supply, Nayef Al Fayez minister of tourism and antiquities, Labib Khadra minister of higher education and scientific research, and Majd Shweikeh was named minister of information and communications technology.

The ministers that left were: Mohammad Hamed of energy and mineral resources, Hatem Halawani of industry, trade and supply, Amin Mahmoud of higher education and Azzam Sleit of information and communications technology. Ibrahim Saif took over the post of energy. Furthermore, Mohammad Thneibat and Nasser Judeh were appointed deputy prime minister while keeping their own posts.

On 19 May 2015 Salameh Hammad replaced Interior Minister Hussein Al-Majali who had resigned two days before.

== Cabinet members ==
As of August 2013, the members of the cabinet is as follows:

- Prime Minister and Minister of Defence: Abdullah Ensour
- Minister of Interior and Minister of Municipal Affairs: Salameh Hammad
- Minister of Awqaf and Islamic Affairs: Mohammad Qudah (Until 21 August); Hayel Daoud
- Minister of Finance: Umayya Toukan
- Minister of Foreign Affairs: Nasser Judeh
- Minister of Industry, Trade and Supply: Maha Ali
- Minister of Information and Communications Technology: Azzam Sleit
- Minister of Energy and Mineral Resources: Malek Kabariti (Until 21 August); Mohammad Hamed
- Minister of Labour and Minister of Transport: Nidal Katamine (latter post until 21 August)
- Minister of Transport: Lina Shabib
- Minister of Justice and Minister of State for Prime Ministry Affairs: Ahmad Ziadat (Until 21 August)
- Minister of Justice: Bassam Talhouni
- Ministry of Higher Education and Scientific Research: Labib Khadra
- Minister of Education: Mohammad Wahsh (Until 21 August); Mohammad Thneibat
- Minister of Public Works and Housing: Walid Masri (Until 21 August); Sami Halaseh
- Minister of Social Development: Reem Abu Hassan
- Minister of Environment and Minister of Health: Mujalli Mhailan (Until 21 August)
- Minister of Environment: Taher Shakhshir
- Minister of Health: Ali Hiasat
- Minister of Planning and International Cooperation and Minister of Tourism and Antiquities: Ibrahim Saif
- Minister of Water and Irrigation, and Minister of Agriculture: Hazem Nasser (latter post until 21 August)
- Minister of Agriculture: Akef Zubi
- Minister of State for Parliamentary Affairs: Sameeh Al Maaytah
- Minister of Culture: Barakat Awajan (Until 21 August); Lana Mamkegh
- Minister of State for Media Affairs and Communications and Minister of Political Development and Parliamentary Affairs: Mohammad Momani (Until 21 August)
- Minister of Political Development and Parliamentary Affairs: Khaled Kalaldeh
- Minister of State: Salameh Neimat

Preceded by First cabinet of Ensour	Cabinet of Jordan; 2013 - 2016	Succeeded by Incumbent
