= Awn Shawkat Al-Khasawneh's cabinet =

Cabinet of Jordan

The Cabinet of Jordan is the chief executive body of the Hashemite Kingdom of Jordan.

The cabinet was dissolved in April 2012.

| × | Incumbent | Office | Website |
|---|---|---|---|
| 1 | Awn Shawkat Al-Khasawneh | Prime Minister and Minister of Defence | http://www.pm.gov.jo |
| 2 | Eid Dahiyat | Minister of Education | https://www.moe.gov.jo/ |
| 3 | Salim Al Zoubi | Minister of Justice | http://www.moj.gov.jo/ |
| 4 | Abdul Salam Abbadi | Minister of Awqaf and Islamic Affairs | http://www.awqaf.gov.jo/ |
| 5 | Sami Gammoh | Minister of Industry and Trade | http://www.mit.gov.jo/ |
| 6 | Nasser Judeh | Minister of Foreign Affairs | http://www.mfa.gov.jo |
| 7 | Rowaida Maaitah | Ministry of Higher Education and Scientific Research | http://www.mohe.gov.jo/ |
| 8 | Bassem Roussan | Minister of Information and Communications Technology | http://www.moict.gov.jo/ |
| 9 | Alaa Batayneh | Minister of Transport | http://www.mot.gov.jo/ |
| 10 | Ayman Odeh | Minister of State for Prime Ministry Affairs and Legislation | http://www.pm.gov.jo |
| 11 | Jafar Hassan | Minister of Planning and International Cooperation | http://www.mop.gov.jo/ |
| 12 | Nesreen Barakat | Minister of Social Development | http://www.mosd.gov.jo/ |
| 13 | Yahya Kisbi | Minister of Public Works and Housing | |
| 14 | Abdul Latif Wreikat | Minister of Health | http://www.moh.gov.jo/ |
| 15 | Umayya Toukan | Minister of Finance | http://www.mof.gov.jo/ |
| 16 | Maher Wakid | Minister of Labour | http://www.mol.gov.jo/ |
| 17 | Salah Jarrar | Minister of Culture | http://www.culture.gov.jo/ |
| 18 | Yaseen Khayyat | Minister of Environment | http://www.tourism.jo/ |
| 19 | Khleif Al Khawaldeh | Minister of Public Sector Development | https://web.archive.org/web/20130106181350/http://www.mopsd.gov.jo/ |
| 20 | Nayef Al Fayez | Minister of Tourism and Antiquities | http://www.tourism.jo/ |
| 21 | Mousa Jamani | Minister of Water and Irrigation | http://www.mwi.gov.jo/ |
| 22 | Mohammad Al Raoud | Minister of Interior | https://moi.gov.jo/ |
| 23 | Klaib Al-Fawwaz | Minister of State for Cabinet Affairs | https://web.archive.org/web/20120105012220/http://www.pm.gov.jo/ |
| 24 | Ahmed Al Khattab | Minister of Agriculture | |
| 25 | Haya Qaralleh | Minister of Political Development and Parliamentary Affairs | |
| 26 | Mahir Abul Samin | Minister of Municipal Affairs | |
| 27 | Qutaiba Abu Qura | Minister of Energy and Mineral Resources | http://www.memr.gov.jo/ |
| 28 | Rakan Majali | Minister of State for Media Affairs and Communications | |
| 29 | Ibrahim Jazi | Minister of State for Legal Affairs | |
| 30 | Mohammad Qudah | Minister of Youth and Sports | https://www.moy.gov.jo/ |

| Preceded by Marouf al-Bakhit's second Cabinet | Cabinet of Jordan; October 24, 2011 - May 2, 2012 | Succeeded by Fayez al-Tarawneh's second cabinet |
