= Maha Ali =

Jordanian politician (born 1973)

Her Excellency Maha Ali
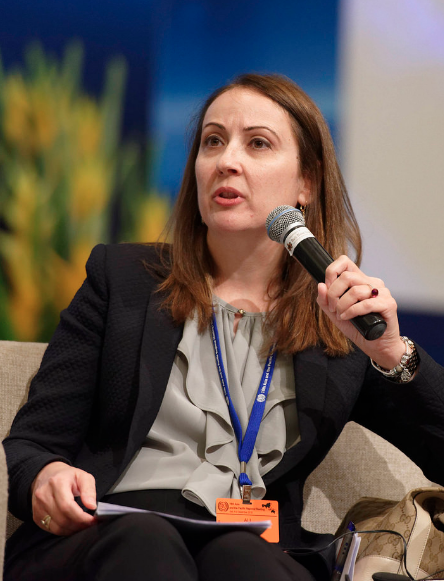

Minister of Industry, Trade and Supply
- In office 12 October 2020 – 11 October 2021
- Monarch: Abdullah II
- Prime Minister: Bisher Al-Khasawneh
- Succeeded by: Yousef Shamali

Minister of Industry, Trade and Supply
- In office 2 March 2015 – 1 June 2016
- Monarch: Abdullah II
- Prime Minister: Abdullah Ensour
- Preceded by: Hatem Halawani

Secretary General of the Ministry of Industry, Trade and Supply
- In office 2010–2015

Personal details
- Born: Maha Abdel-Rahim Ali; 17 May 1973 (age 53) Amman, Jordan
- Party: Independent
- Education: University of Jordan; German Jordanian University

Maha Ali (Arabic: مها علي; born 17 May 1973) is a Jordanian politician and industrial engineer who served as Minister of Industry, Trade and Supply of Jordan from October 2020 to October 2021, in the Cabinet of Prime Minister Bisher Al-Khasawneh.

Prior to her recent appointment, Ali previously also served as Minister of Industry, Trade and Supply in 2015-2016, assuming the position after a cabinet reshuffle in Prime Minister Abdullah Ensour's government on 2 March 2015.

== Early life and education ==
Maha Ali was born in Amman in 1973. Her father is a Jordanian medical doctor and retired general in the Jordanian Armed Forces. She is trilingual in Arabic, English and French.

Ali has a B.Sc. in industrial engineering from the University of Jordan, a trade policy diploma from the WTO in Switzerland and an MBA from the German Jordanian University.

According to Durham University, Ali is pursuing a PhD in Business from the university's business school, with research interests in "Institutions and Outward FDIs from the MENA Region".

== Political career ==
Ali began her public service career in 1998. From August 1998 until February 2001, she was a researcher at the World Trade Organization. Ali was then assigned as the Head of Trade in the Services Section of the Foreign Trade Policy Department until April 2002. Between April 2002 and April 2003, she was assigned as a deputy economic counsellor at Jordan's permanent mission to the United Nations. In October 2003 she assumed the role of the director of the Foreign Trade Policy Department until 2010, when she became Secretary-General (deputy minister) of the ministry.

During her incumbency as Secretary-General, she led negotiations on Jordan's accession to the WTO and was the head of the Jordanian delegation on the country's adherence to the OECD. Ali also hosted the investments and trade pillar of the Deauville Partnership meeting in 2012 and has played a key role during joint committee meetings with Jordan's trade partners. She additionally led work on Jordan's historic free trade agreements with the US, Singapore, Canada and Turkey.

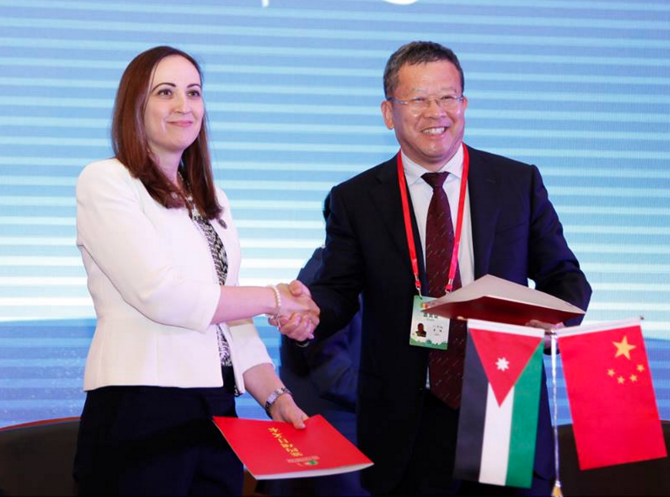
Ali overseeing Sino-Jordanian trade negotiations in 2015.

Ali was a board member of a number of government institutions including Jordan Enterprise Development Corporation, Jordan Investment Board, and Jordan Development Zones Company prior to her being appointed minister.

On 2 March 2015, a cabinet reshuffle in the Second Cabinet of Abdullah Ensour saw Ali appointed as Minister of Industry, Trade and Supply. Abdullah Ensour's government resigned on 1 June 2016.

On 12 October 2020, a Royal Decree was issued, approving the formation of a new Cabinet, headed by Bisher Al-Khasawneh. In addition, alongside other Cabinet members, the Decree approved the appointment of Ali as Minister of Industry, Trade and Supply.

== Educational career ==
Ali worked as an industrial professor at the School of Management and Logistical Sciences at the German Jordanian University. Additionally, she was a professor of practice at the Al Hussein Technical University (HTU).

Her research interests include international trade and international business.

== Honours and awards ==
Ali was ranked as the 8th Most Powerful Arab Woman in Government by Forbes in 2015 and has been awarded several royal medals by Jordan's King Abdullah II for her efficiency in civil service, including the Order of Independence of the third class.

In 2016, she received the Governor General's Medallion by the Governor General of Canada David Johnston, for efforts exerted in strengthening trade between Jordan and Canada.

== See also ==
- Second cabinet of Abdullah Ensour
- Bisher Al-Khasawneh's Cabinet
