= Fayez al-Tarawneh's second cabinet =

Cabinet of Jordan

The Cabinet of Jordan is the chief executive body of the Hashemite Kingdom of Jordan.

×	Incumbent	Office	Website
1	Fayez Tarawneh	Prime Minister and Minister of Defence	http://www.pm.gov.jo
2	Fayez Saudi	Minister of Education	https://www.moe.gov.jo/
3	Khalifah Suleiman	Minister of Justice	http://www.moj.gov.jo/
4	Abdul Salam Abbadi	Minister of Awqaf and Islamic Affairs	http://www.awqaf.gov.jo/
5	Shabib Ammari	Minister of Industry and Trade	http://www.mit.gov.jo/
6	Nasser Judeh	Minister of Foreign Affairs	http://www.mfa.gov.jo
7	Wajih Owais	Ministry of Higher Education and Scientific Research	http://www.mohe.gov.jo/
8	Atef Tel	Minister of Information and Communications Technology	http://www.moict.gov.jo/
9	Hashem Masaid	Minister of Transport	http://www.mot.gov.jo/
10	Kamel Said	Minister of State for Prime Ministry Affairs and Legislation	http://www.pm.gov.jo
11	Jafar Hassan	Minister of Planning and International Cooperation	http://www.mop.gov.jo/
12	Wajih Azaizeh	Minister of Social Development	http://www.mosd.gov.jo/
13	Yahya Kisbi	Minister of Public Works and Housing	
14	Abdullatif Wreikat	Minister of Health	http://www.moh.gov.jo/
15	Suleiman Hafez	Minister of Finance	http://www.mof.gov.jo/
16	Ateb Odeibat	Minister of Labour	http://www.mol.gov.jo/
17	Salah Jarrar	Minister of Culture	http://www.culture.gov.jo/
18	Yasin Khayyat	Minister of Environment	http://www.tourism.jo/
19	Khleif Khawaldeh	Minister of Public Sector Development	https://web.archive.org/web/20130106181350/http://www.mopsd.gov.jo/
20	Nayef Fayez	Minister of Tourism and Antiquities	http://www.tourism.jo/
21	Mohammad Najjar	Minister of Water and Irrigation	http://www.mwi.gov.jo/
22	Ghaleb Zubi	Minister of Interior	https://moi.gov.jo/
23	Samih Maayatah	Minister of Information	
24	Ahmed Al Khattab	Minister of Agriculture	https://www.moa.gov.jo/
25	Nufan Agarmeh	Minister of Political Development and Parliamentary Affairs	https://www.moppa.gov.jo/
26	Maher Abu Samn	Minister of Municipal Affairs	
27	Alaa Batayneh	Minister of Energy and Mineral Resources	http://www.memr.gov.jo/
28	Sharari al-Shakhanbeh	Minister of State for Parliamentary Affairs	https://www.moppa.gov.jo/
29	Nadia Hashem	Minister of State for Women's Affairs	
30	Yusef Jazi	Minister of State	

Preceded by Awn Shawkat Al-Khasawneh's cabinet	Cabinet of Jordan; 2 May 2012 - 11 October 2012	Succeeded by Abdullah Ensour's cabinet
