= Abdullah Ensour's cabinet =

Cabinet of Jordan

The Cabinet of Jordan is the chief executive body of the Hashemite Kingdom of Jordan.

×	Incumbent	Office	Website
1	Abdullah Ensour	Prime Minister and Minister of Defence	https://www.pm.gov.jo
2	Awad Khleifat	Deputy Prime Minister and Minister of Interior	
3	Abdul Salam Al Abbadi	Minister of Awqaf and Islamic Affairs	https://www.awqaf.gov.jo/
4	Suleiman Hafez	Minister of Finance	https://www.mof.gov.jo/
5	Nasser Judeh	Minister of Foreign Affairs	https://www.mfa.gov.jo
6	Hatem Hafez Al Halawani	Minister of Industry and Trade	https://www.mit.gov.jo/
6	Hatem Hafez Al Halawani	Minister of Information and Communications Technology	https://www.moict.gov.jo/
7	Alaa Batayneh	Minister of Energy and Mineral Resources	https://www.memr.gov.jo/
7	Alaa Batayneh	Minister of Transport	https://www.mot.gov.jo/
8	Ghaleb Zubi	Minister of Justice	https://www.moj.gov.jo/
9	Jafar Hassan	Minister of Planning and International Cooperation	https://www.mop.gov.jo/
10	Wajih Owais	Ministry of Higher Education and Scientific Research	https://www.mohe.gov.jo/
10	Wajih Owais	Minister of Education	https://www.moe.gov.jo/
11	Yahya Kisbi	Minister of Public Works and Housing	
12	Wajih Azaizeh	Minister of Social Development	https://www.mosd.gov.jo/
13	Abdul Latif Wreikat	Minister of Health	https://www.moh.gov.jo/
14	Khleif Ahmad Al Khawaldeh	Minister of Public Sector Development	https://web.archive.org/web/20130106181350/http://www.mopsd.gov.jo/
15	Nayef Al-Fayez	Minister of Tourism and Antiquities	https://www.tourism.jo/
15	Nayef Al-Fayez	Minister of Environment	https://www.moenv.gov.jo/
16	Ahmed Al Khattab	Minister of Agriculture	https://www.moa.gov.jo/
17	Maher Abu Samn	Minister of Municipal Affairs	
17	Maher Abu Samn	Minister of Water and Irrigation	https://www.mwi.gov.jo/
18	Noufan Al Ajarmeh	Minister of State for Prime Ministry Affairs and Legislation	https://www.pm.gov.jo
19	Sameeh Al Maaytah	Minister of State for Parliamentary Affairs	https://www.moppa.gov.jo/
19	Sameeh Al Maaytah	Minister of Culture	https://www.culture.gov.jo/
20	Bassam Salamah Haddadin	Minister of Political Development and Parliamentary Affairs	https://www.moppa.gov.jo/
21	Nidal Mardi Al Qatamin	Minister of Labour	https://www.mol.gov.jo/

Preceded by Fayez al-Tarawneh's second cabinet	Cabinet of Jordan; 2012 - 2013	Succeeded by Ensour's second cabinet
