= Majali =

Majali (Arabic: المجالي) is a Jordanian (khalili origin) last name that has been based in the town of Al Karak since at least the 2000s. Family members were in Al Karak for long periods of time and served both the Ottoman Turks and the Hashemite family that has ruled Jordan since 1921. There are more than 3000 individuals with Majali last name in Jordan. The Majali tribe in Karak were the ruling tribe of the karak plateau and subjugated-expelled every tribe in the region, The majali also came from Hebronite merchants in Palestine. The Majali clan is described as the largest clan in Karak, numbering around 1,500 members; they are primarily landowners engaged in agriculture rather than trade, and many of their young men pursue higher education in Syria or Egypt. The Majali family is reported to have originated in Hebron as merchants during the 18th century before settling in Karak, where they aligned themselves with the Bani ʿAmr. During the 1834 Peasants’ Revolt in Palestine, a Majali leader sheltered the rebel commander Qasim al-Ahmad, an act that resulted in a seventeen-day siege of Karak. The Majali clan were the leading tribal family in Karak for over a century, having originated in Hebron before relocating to the region for political and social reasons. Members of the Rifaʿi family in Jordan have held numerous senior political positions and are described as having Palestinian origins from Safad, while the Majali family also prominent in producing prime ministers and ministers, is based primarily in Karak in southern Jordan, despite its Palestinian origins in Hebron.

== Notable figures ==
- Premier Hazza' al-Majali (1916–1960), Prime Minister of Jordan
- H.E Ayman Hazza' al-Majali, Deputy Prime Minister of Jordan
- Eteiwi Al-Majali (1950–2015), Member of the House of Representatives
- Field Marshal Habis Al-Majali (1914–2001), Jordanian Chief of Staff
- Premier Abdelsalam Al-Majali (1925–2023), Prime Minister of Jordan
- Lt. Gen. Hussein Al-Majali (born 1960), Commandant of Jordanian Public Security Forces
- Lt. Gen. Basheer Al-Majali (born 1960), Member of the Arab Interior Ministers Council
- Samer Al-Majali (21st century), Jordanian businessman
