= Awad Khleifat =

Jordanian politician (born 1945)

Deputy Prime Minister and Minister of Interior
- In office 11 October 2012 – 30 March 2013
- Monarch: King Abdullah II
- Prime Minister: Abdullah Ensour
- Preceded by: Ghaleb Zubi (Interior Minister)
- Succeeded by: Hussein Al-Majali (Interior Minister)

Personal details
- Born: Awad Mohamad Khleifat; 1945 (age 80–81) Wadi Musa, Jordan
- Education: SOAS, University of London

Awad Khleifat (born 1945) is a Jordanian politician who served as the Hashemite Kingdom of Jordan's deputy prime minister and interior minister from October 2012 to late March 2013.

== Early life and education ==
Khleifat was born in Wadi Musa in the Petra region in 1945. He holds a PhD in history, which he received from SOAS, University of London in 1973. The title of his thesis is The Caliphate of Hisham b. 'Abd al-Malik (105-125/724-743) with special reference to internal problems.

== Career ==
Khleifat served as chairman of Mutah University from 1989 to 1991. Then he joined politics, and served as a member of the upper house several times. He also served in different Jordanian cabinets. One of his cabinet positions was minister of higher education. He was also deputy prime minister. In addition, Khleifat served as interior minister several times, for instance, in 1996. He was also appointed interior minister in June 2000 to the cabinet of Ali Abu Ragheb. His term ended in January 2002, and he was replaced by Qaftan Al Majali. Khleifat was appointed to the upper house of parliament on 17 November 2003. King Abdullah II appointed Khleifat to the royal committee on 31 January 2006. On 17 December 2009, he was again appointed to the upper house of parliament.

Khleifat was again appointed interior minister and also, deputy prime minister to the cabinet led by Abdullah Ensour formed on 11 October 2012. His term ended on 30 March 2013 and Hussein Majali replaced him as interior minister in the cabinet reshuffle. The post of deputy prime minister was not filled in the reshuffle.

== Personal life ==
Khleifat awarded the Kawkab Medal of the First Order and the Istiqlal Medal of the First Order.
