= GJU =

GJU may refer to:

- German Jordanian University, in Madaba, Jordan
- Guru Jambheshwar University of Science and Technology, in Hisar, Haryana, India
