= Salameh Neimat =

Jordanian politician (born 1955)

Minister of State

Acting Minister of Social Development

Salameh Naimat is a Jordanian politician who has held various ministerial positions. His political career spans roles as the Minister of State and acting Minister of Social Development. Naimat has also been involved in international collaborations, notably with Yemen, and has been instrumental in supporting media in Jordan.

== Early life and education ==
Salameh Naimat was born in 1955 in Ma'an. He received his Ph.D. in History from the University of Durham, with an MA and BA in the same field from the University of Jordan.

== Career ==
=== Minister of state ===
Salameh Naimat served as Minister of State in the Jordanian government. He was part of Abdullah Ensour's second cabinet, which was formed in March 2013. Neimat held the position of Minister of Interior and Minister of Local Government.

=== Acting minister of social development ===
In his role as Acting Minister of Social Development, Naimat led an investigation into allegations of mismanagement at the Rousseff Juvenile Centre. The investigation was launched in response to claims that ministry employees facilitated the escape of residents in exchange for money.

== Contributions to media ==
Naimat has been involved in initiatives to support the media in Jordan. He participated in the launch of a three-year media project funded by the European Union (EU) in October 2014. The "Media Support in Jordan" project was part of a wider EU initiative to support civil society and the media and was implemented.

== International relations ==
=== Collaboration with Yemen ===
Naimat has also been involved in international collaborations. In April 2014, a Yemeni cabinet delegation visited Jordan to get information from the departments of the Prime Minister and its administrative functions. Nimat met the delegates and expressed Jordan's readiness to provide them with the necessary management expertise.

=== Stance on Jerusalem ===
Naimat has been vocal about Jordan's position on Jerusalem. He has echoed the sentiments of King Abdullah II of Jordan, saying that Jerusalem is a "red line" for Jordan.
