= Awn Al-Qaddoumi =

Shaykh Awn Al-Qaddoumi
- عون القدومي
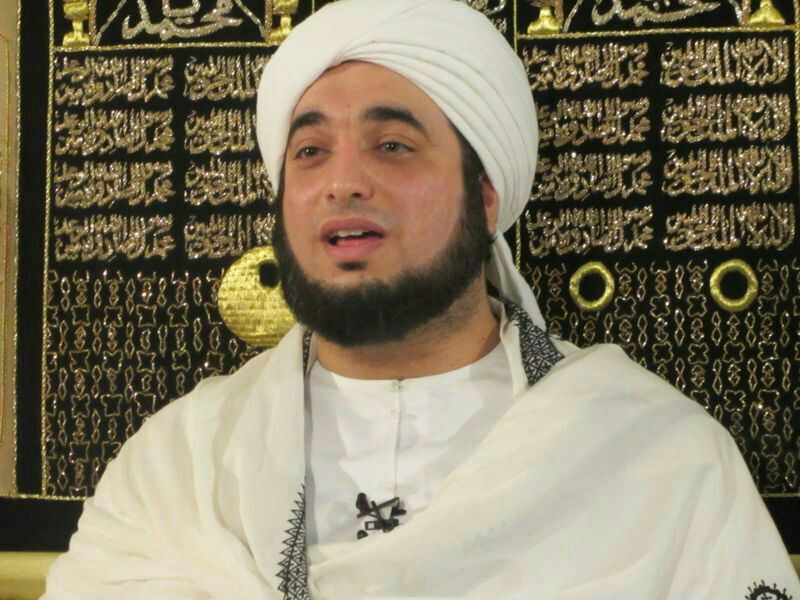
- Al-Qaddoumi in 2013
- Born: عون; July 2, 1982 (age 44); Amman, Jordan
- Citizenship: Jordanian
- Occupations: Islamic scholar, teacher
- Organization: The Ma’arij Institute
- Known for: Founder of The Ma’arij Institute
- Title: Shaykh
- Parent: Mu’een Al-Qaddoumi (father)

Awn Al-Qaddoumi (Arabic: عون القدومي), is a well-known Sunni scholar and preacher. He is a popular media host and the principal of The Ma’arij Institute of Islamic Studies in Amman, Jordan. he pursued his shari’ah studies at the University of Jordan; and currently he is continuing higher academic studies at the Islamic University of Lebanon.

Awn travels extensively to lecture and has done so at several important seats of Islamic learning like as Al-Azhar University (Egypt) and Dar al-Mustafa (Yemen). Also, he has appeared several times on TV, radio, and the internet. There are many audio and video recordings of his classes, lectures, and seminars available online. He is one of the initial founders of the LIFE radio station, a project he worked on until recently.

Awn has learned from many scholars, the following are some of them:

- Noah Qudah, the previous mufti of Jordan.
- Sa’id Fouda.
- Habib Umar bin Hafiz.
