= Abdul Karim Khasawneh =

Jordanian Muslim scholar (born 1944)

Sheikh Abdul Karim Khasawneh
- Title: Grand Mufti of Jordan

Personal life
- Born: 1944 (age 81–82) Irbid Governorate, Transjordan
- Education: Damascus University

Religious life
- Religion: Islam
- Denomination: Sunni Islam

Abdul Karim Saleem Khasawneh (Arabic: عبد الكريم سليم الخصاونة; born 1944) is a Jordanian Muslim scholar who was Grand Mufti of Jordan between 23 February 2010 and 22 January 2017, when he became the chief Islamic justice. He returned to the post of Grand Mufti from 11 November 2019 to 5 November 2023.

== Career ==
Khasawneh was born in 1944 in Irbid Governorate. In 1973, he earned a degree at Damascus University and worked there as well. He returned to Jordan and eventually became Mufti of the Jordanian Armed Forces, and served as a Major General. In this capacity he was present at the International Islamic Conference, 2005. On 23 February 2010, he succeeded Noah Qudah as Grand Mufti of Jordan.

In November 2011, he was present at the Second Muslim Catholic Forum, an interreligious initiative started after the 2007 open letter A Common Word Between Us and You.

On 22 January 2017, Khasawneh was named chief Islamic justice of Jordan, succeeding Ahmad Hilayel. He was succeeded as Grand Mufti by Mohammad Khalaileh.

He was reappointed as Grand Mufti on 11 November 2019. On 5 November 2023, he resigned as Grand Mufti and was replaced with Ahmad Hasanat.

Khasawneh is a member of the Jordanian Ifta Council and member of the board of the World Islamic Sciences and Education University.

== See also ==
- 2016 international conference on Sunni Islam in Grozny

Sunni Islam titles
| Preceded by Noah Qudah | Grand Mufti of Jordan; 23 February 2010 – 22 January 2017 | Succeeded by Mohammad Khalaileh |
| Preceded by | Grand Mufti of Jordan; 11 November 2019 – 5 November 2023 | Succeeded by Ahmad Hasanat |
