= Farah Nafi =

Jordanian engineer and basketball player

Farah Nafi Abu Abed
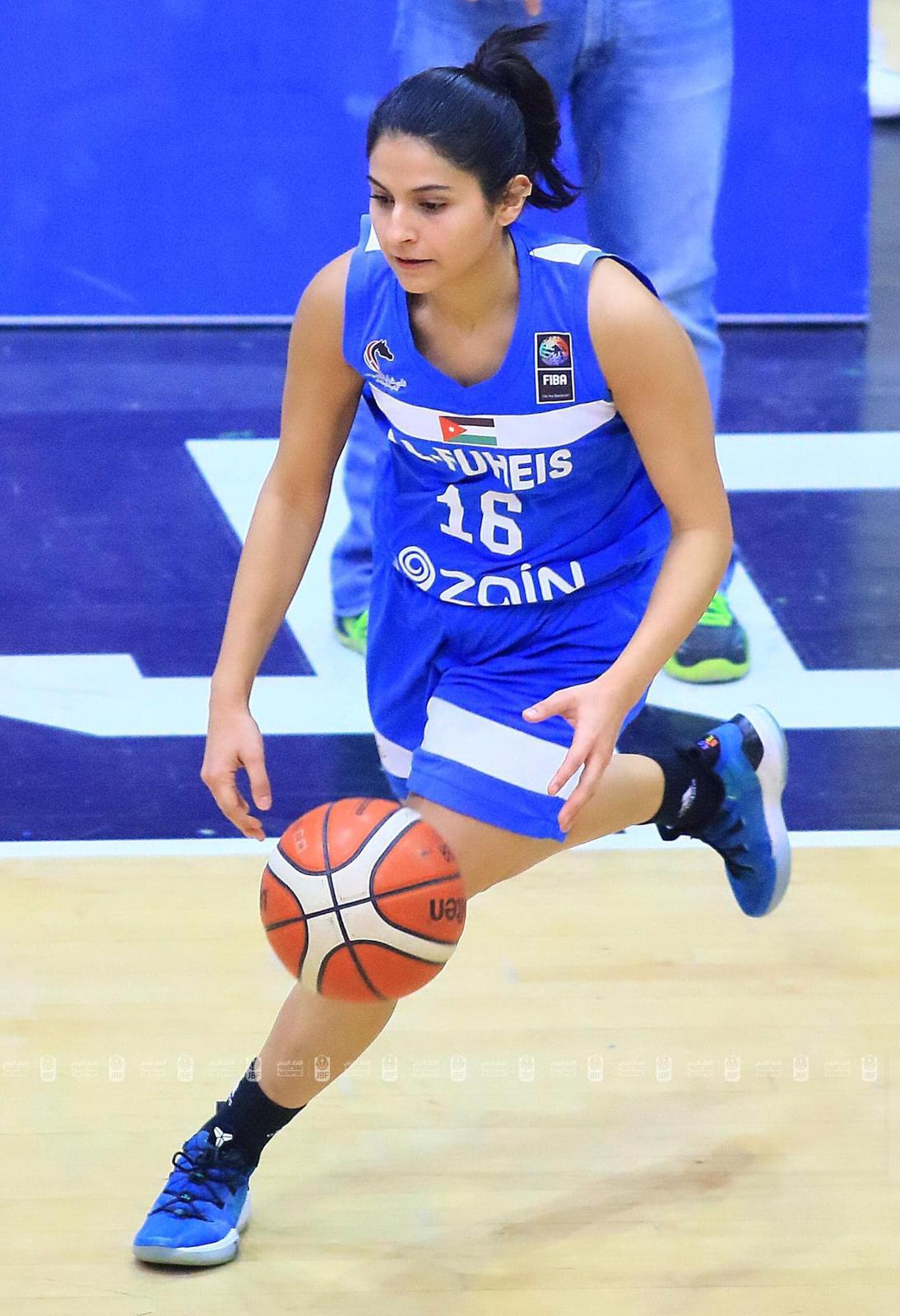
- Farah Nafi AbuAbed

Personal information
- Born: 2 October 1993 (age 33)
- Listed height: 168 cm (5 ft 6 in)

Career information
- Playing career: 2007–present
- Position: Point guard

Career history
- 2007-2011: Orthodox U14 & U16
- 2011-2012: American University of Beirut (AUB)
- 2013-2014: Orthodox (Jordan)
- 2015 - present: Al-Fuheis Club

Career highlights
- Jordan League Champion 3 times (2014, 2019, & 2020); Arab Games Champion 2020
Medals
Jordan League
Gold medal – first place	2014
Gold medal – first place	2019
Gold medal – first place	2020
Arab Club Games
Silver medal – second place	2018
Gold medal – first place	2020
Arab Club Competition
Silver medal – second place	2016

Farah Nafi Abu Abed (born 2 October 1993) is an engineer from Jordan and the captain of Al-Fuheis Basketball Club.

== Early life ==
Farah was born in Riyadh, Saudi Arabia on 02.10.1993, and moved to Amman, Jordan in 2005. Enrolled in National Orthodox School and started playing Basketball in 2007.

== Education ==
she Graduated from High-School (IGCSE) with 94.5% and studied 1st year (2011-2012) at AUB. Then went back to Amman to continue her studies at German Jordanian University at the Pharmaceutical-Chemical Engineering department. She graduated in June 2017.

== Career ==
Farah Nafi started her career as an Intern at Philip Morris International (PMI) through Inkompass (PMI internship program), and after six months into her first full-time role in the company and promoted to Project lead then Process Lead. Currently, She is Working as a Customer Care Executive.

=== Basketball ===
Farah Nafi started playing with Orthodox club in U14 category. She has represented Jordan in the School National Team twice in Amman, Jordan & once in Beirut, Lebanon (where the team finished in the second place).

Farah represented 3x3 Jordan Team in Three international competition:

- 2009 (Asian Youth Games in Singapore)
- 2011 (World Cup in Rimini, Italy).
- 2018 FIBA 3x3 Asia Cup

In her study year at American University of Beirut (AUB) she played for the campus team in the universities League in Lebanon, and played a tournament in Belgium.

Farah Played for Orthodox Senior Women Team in 2013-2014 season and won the Jordan League. The team also finished in the third place in the Fatima Bint Mubarak Tournament in Sharjah, UAE. She went to Germany for an exchange year where she played for a club in Dresden until December 2015. Then, She joined Al-Fuheis club and has since then, the club has achieved the following:

- 3rd place in 2015 Bani Yas competitions (UAE)
- 2nd place in 2018 Women Arab Club Games (UAE)
- 1st place in 2020 Women Arab Club Games (Sharjah, UAE)
- 2nd place in 2016 Arab Club Competition (Jordan)
- Semi Final in 2017 Arab Club Competition (Jordan)
- Semi Final in 2018 Arab Club Competition (Egypt)
- 4th place in 2019 Arab Club Competition (Morocco)
- Jordan League Champions 2018-2019 & 2019-2020
