= Lana Mamkegh =

Lana Mamkegh is a Jordanian politician, journalist, and government minister of Culture.

== Early life ==
Lana Mamkegh completed her Bachelor of Arts and Master of Arts from the University of Jordan. In 2002 she completed her Doctorate program from the University of Jordan.

== Career ==
Lana Mamkegh worked as a journalist at The Daily Al Ra'i, an Arabic language Jordanian Newspaper owned by the Government of Jordan. She worked in the faculty of arts in Isra University. She also worked at the faculty of arts and sciences in the University of Petra in Amman, Jordan. She worked in a number of radio stations in Jordan. She also was a producer on Jordan Television and presented TV shows. On 2 March 2015, she was made the Minister of Culture in the cabinet of Prime Minister Abdullah Ensour, one of five women appointed ministers in the cabinet. As the minister she worked with to establish the Cultural City of Jerash project in Jerash, the capital of the Jerash Governorate in Jordan. She has also worked to improve cultural ties between Armenia and Jordan and the Armenian community in Jordan.
