= Ahmed Al Khattab =

Jordanian politician (1942–2021)

Member of the House of Representatives of Jordan
- In office 1997–2001

Minister of Agriculture of Jordan
- In office 17 October 2011 – 30 March 2013

Personal details
- Born: 1942 Ma'an, Emirate of Transjordan
- Died: 9 May 2021 (aged 78–79)
- Party: Independent

Ahmed Al Khattab (Arabic: أحمد آل خطاب) (1942 – 9 May 2021) was a Jordanian politician.

== Biography ==
Al Khattab was born in Ma'an in 1942. He graduated from the Palestine Technical University – Kadoorie in 1962 with a bachelor's degree in agriculture. He went on to serve as President of the university's Alumni Club.

Al Khattab became Director of Agriculture for the Ma'an Governorate and was also railway director in Aqaba. He was elected to the House of Representatives of Jordan, serving from 1997 to 2001. He was also Minister of Agriculture of Jordan in Awn Shawkat Al-Khasawneh's cabinet, Fayez al-Tarawneh's second cabinet, and Abdullah Ensour's cabinet.

In 2013 and in 2018, the Palestine Technical University – Kadoorie honored him as a pioneering graduate.

Ahmed Al Khattab died on 9 May 2021.
