= Lina Shabib =

Jordanian politician

Minister of Transport
- Incumbent
- Assumed office 21 August 2013

Lina Shabib is a Jordanian engineer, politician and former government Minister of Transport.

== Biography ==
Lina Shahib was appointed the Minister of Transport of Jordan in the cabinet of Prime Minister Abdullah Ensour on 21 August 2013. She attended the General Assembly of the Arab Bridge Maritime Company in Cairo, Egypt on 31 December 2013, where she discussed ways to improve transport connections with Egypt and Iraq. Under her, the transport ministry filed a complaint with the International Civil Aviation Organization against Israel over the construction of Ramon Airport in Timna Valley in July 2015. Jordan in the complaint said that the new airport would be to close to its own King Hussein International Airport in Aqaba and will disrupt air traffic to the airport. On 7 May she signed a Memorandum of Understanding with Ivaylo Moskovski, the Bulgarian Minister of Transport, Information Technology and Communications that sought to improve aviation and transport ties between Jordan and Bulgaria.
