= Nuh al-Qudah =

Jordanian Muslim scholar

Sheikh Nuh al-Qudah
- Title: Grand Mufti of Jordan

Personal life
- Born: 1939 Ain Jana, Ajloun, Transjordan
- Died: 19 December 2010 (aged 70–71)
- Notable work: Commentary on Jawharat al-Tawhid
- Education: Damascus University, Al-Azhar University, Imam Muhammad ibn Saud Islamic University

Religious life
- Religion: Islam
- Denomination: Sunni Islam
- Jurisprudence: Shafi'i
- Creed: Ash'ari

Senior posting
- Influenced: Sa'id Foudah

Nuh Ali Salman al-Qudah (1939 – 19 December 2010) was a Jordanian Muslim scholar and the Grand Mufti of Jordan from 2007 to 2010.

== Career ==
Qudah was born in Ain Jana in Ajloun in 1939. He went to Syria in 1954 to study at Islamic schools and he obtained a degree from the College of Sacred Law at Damascus University in 1965. Upon his return to Jordan he joined the Jordanian Armed Forces and became the mufti of the institution in 1972. He continued his studies in Egypt, and in 1980 he obtained a master's degree from Al-Azhar University in Cairo. At the Imam Muhammad ibn Saud Islamic University in Riyadh, Saudi Arabia, he obtained a doctorate in 1986.

Apart from his religious capacities he also served as the Jordanian ambassador to Iran between 1996 and 2001.

Qudah was appointed by royal decree as Grand Mufti of the Kingdom of Jordan on 28 February 2007. In October 2007 he was one of the 138 Muslim signatories of the open letter A Common Word Between Us and You to Christian leaders calling for peace between the Muslim and Christian communities. He resigned on 23 February 2010 and was replaced by Abdul Karim Khasawneh.

== Death ==
On 19 December 2010 Qudah died and he was buried the same day. Thousands were reported to be present at his burial in Ras Munif, Ajloun Governorate, and several politicians and leaders went to offer condolences to the tribe of Qudah. Visitors included Prince Ghazi bin Muhammad, Prime Minister Samir Rifai, House Speaker Faisal al-Fayez, Interior Minister Saad Hayel Srour, and the former chairman of the Joint Chiefs of Staff Mashal Mohammad Al-Zaben. Shortly after his death the Shariah and Law faculty of the World Islamic Sciences and Education University in Amman was renamed after him.

After Qudahs' death, Mohammad Qudah, his son and a former Minister, together with followers of Noah Qudah started the Sheikh Noah Rifadah Society. The organization seeks to alleviate poverty in Jordan.

== See also ==
- Sa'id Foudah
- List of Ash'aris and Maturidis

Preceded by ?	Grand Mufti of Jordan; 28 February 2007 – 23 February 2010	Succeeded by Abdul Karim Khasawneh
