= Manar Fayyad =

Jordanian chemist and former university president

Manar Khaled Fayyad or Al Fayyad (Arabic: منار خالد فياض) is a Jordanian chemist and former President of the German Jordanian University.

== Biography ==
She has a B.Sc. (1972) and M.Sc. (1974) in chemistry from the University of Jordan, and a Ph.D. (1978) in chemistry from the University of Bonn, where her doctoral thesis was Schwefel-Stickstoff- und Phosphor-Verbindungen als Liganden in Übergangsmetallkomplexen (Sulfur-nitrogen and phosphorus compounds as ligands in transition metal complexes). Her specialisation is in water management and the environment, and she has been involved in national and international projects funded by bodies including the United Nations Development Programme, the United States Agency for International Development, the Swedish International Development Cooperation Agency, the European Union and the German government.

She was professor of analytical and inorganic chemistry at the University of Jordan from 1978 to 2013, and Director of its Water and Environment Research and Study Centre from 1999 to 2007 (deputy director 1992-1999). She then became vice-president of the German Jordanian University from 2013 to 2017 and was appointed president in 2017 till 2021
