= Nasser Judeh =

Jordanian politician (born 1961)

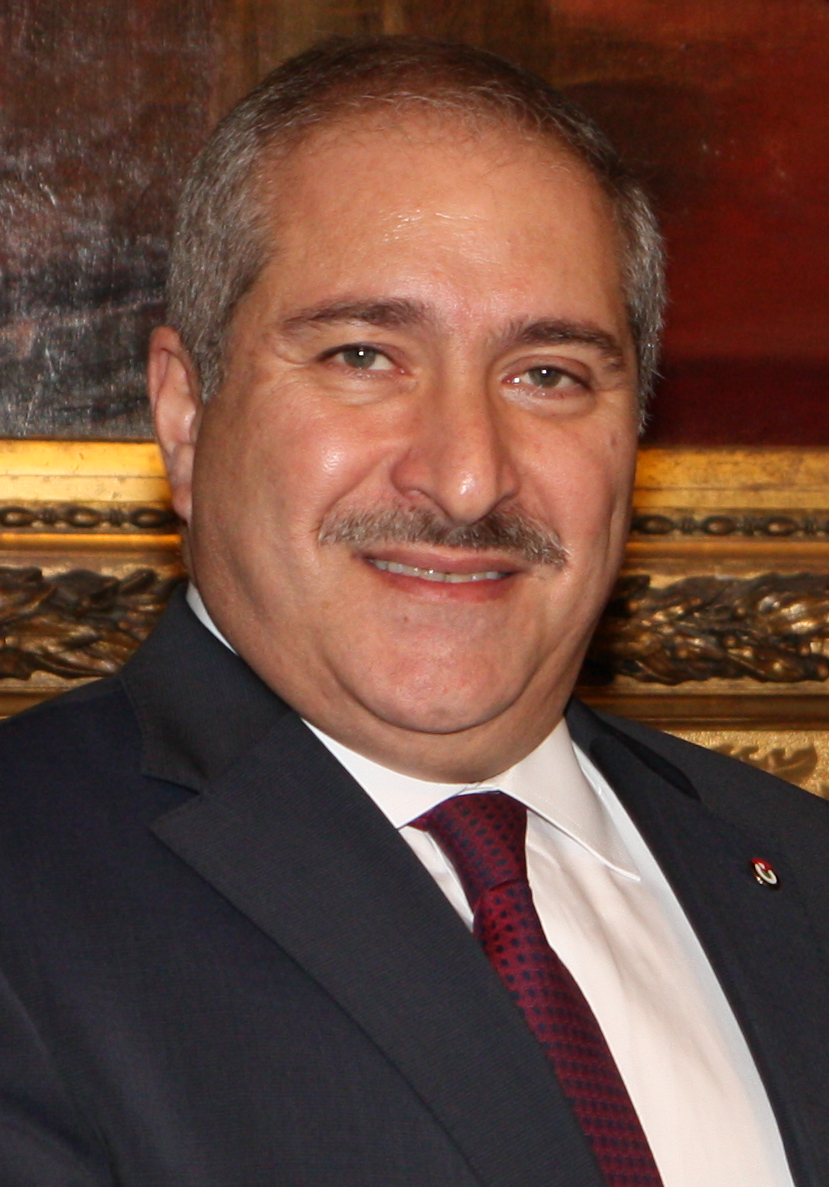

Deputy Prime Minister
- In office May 2015 – 15 January 2017
- Monarch: Abdullah II
- Prime Minister: Abdullah Ensour; Hani Al-Mulki

Minister of Foreign Affairs and Expatriate Affairs
- In office 23 February 2009 – 15 January 2017
- Monarch: Abdullah II
- Prime Minister: Nader al-Dahabi; Samir Rifai; Marouf al-Bakhit; Awn Shawkat Al-Khasawneh; Fayez Tarawneh; Abdullah Ensour; Hani Al-Mulki
- Preceded by: Salah Bashir
- Succeeded by: Ayman Safadi

Personal details
- Born: Nasser Sami Judeh; 11 July 1961 (age 65) Amman, Jordan
- Party: Independent
- Spouse: Princess Sumaya bint Hassan (m. 1992; div. 2008)
- Children: 4
- Education: Eastbourne College; College de La Salle in Amman, Jordan
- Alma mater: Georgetown University

Nasser Judeh (Arabic: ناصر جودة; born 11 July 1961) is a Jordanian politician who served as Jordan's longest serving minister of foreign affairs (later minister of foreign affairs and expatriates), having served between 2009 and 2017 in eight consecutive governments. He also served as deputy prime minister from 2015 to 2017. He serves as a senator in the Jordanian Upper House of Parliament.

== Early life and education ==
Judeh was born in Amman in 1961. His father, Sami Hassan Judeh, was the most senior minister and parliamentarian in Jordan having served in several cabinet and senior government positions, as well as the Upper and Lower Houses of Parliament between 1957 and 2004. Sami Hassan Judeh passed away in 2020.

Judeh received primary education at College de La Salle in Amman from 1966 to 1975, and then attended Eastbourne College in Sussex in England from 1975 to 1979. He was educated in the United States at Georgetown University's School of Foreign Service and obtained a bachelor of arts degree in international politics, law and organization in 1982.

== Career ==
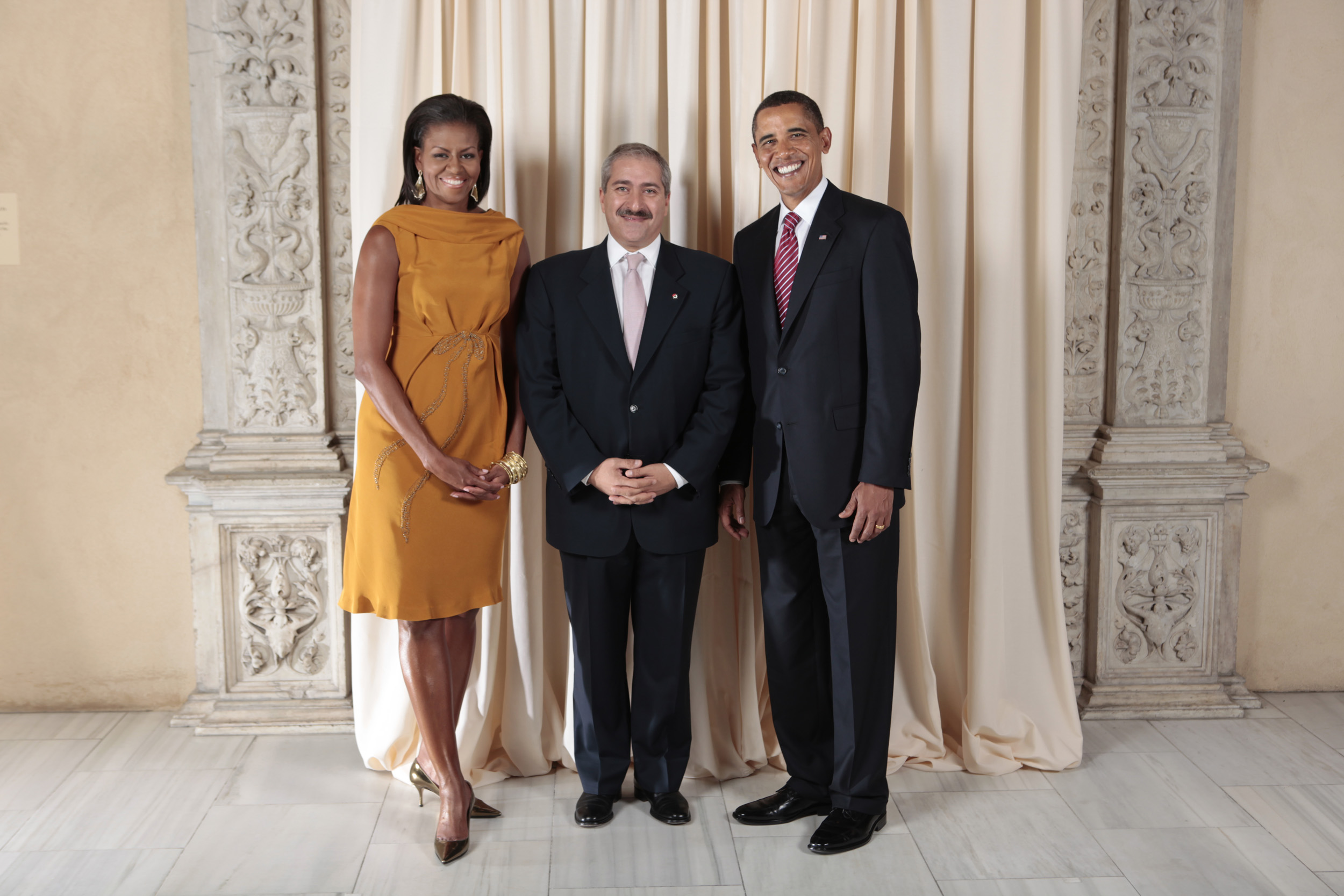
Nasser Judeh with Obamas

Judeh served at the Royal Hashemite Court with King Hussein and then Crown Prince Hassan bin Talal from 1985 to 1992. He was appointed head of the Jordan Information Bureau in London in 1992 and served there until 1994. Then he was named as the director of Jordan Television in 1994. His tenure lasted until 1998, when he was appointed director general of the Jordan Radio and Television Corporation. He was appointed minister of information in August 1998 and also served as the official spokesman for the government. He left the government in 1999 and worked in the private sector for a few years.

=== Spokesperson of the government ===
Judeh returned to office in 2005 again as the official spokesman for the government, and subsequently was appointed minister of state for media affairs and communication in 2007, serving in that post until 2009. During this period, he also acted as the government spokesperson.

=== Minister of foreign affairs ===
Judeh was appointed by King Abdullah II as minister of foreign affairs in the cabinet of Prime Minister Nader Dahabi. He continued to serve as foreign minister in all the cabinets formed between 2009 and 2017. He held the portfolio of foreign minister for the fifth time in the cabinet who assumed the post on 11 October 2012. Judeh retained his post in the second cabinet of Ensour formed on 30 March 2013. In 2015 he was made deputy prime minister alongside his role as foreign minister. His tenure as deputy prime minister and foreign minister ended on 15 January 2017 after a cabinet reshuffle.

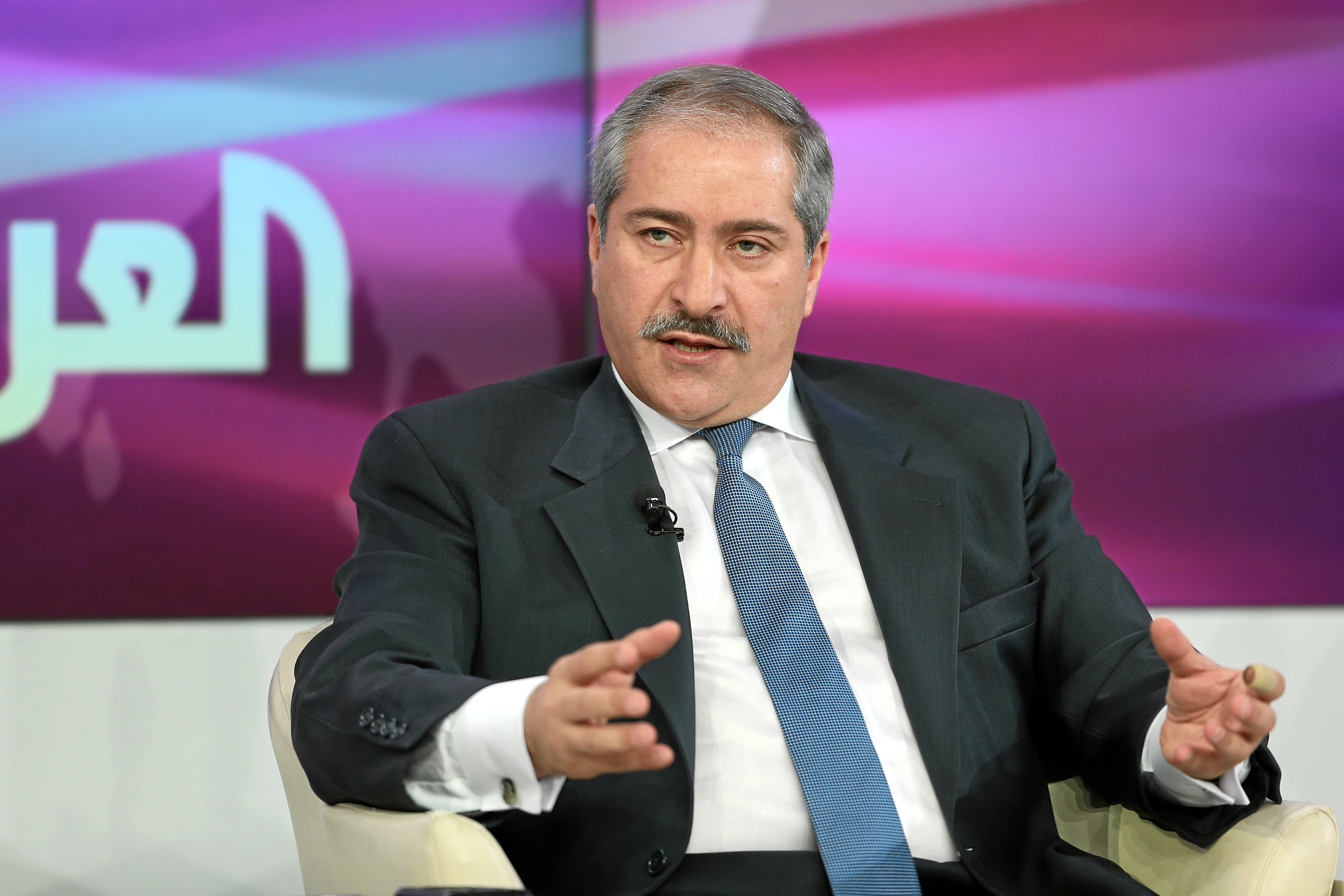
Judeh during the WEF 2013

== Other activities ==
Judeh was appointed to the Senate of the Hashemite Kingdom of Jordan on 9 July 2017. On 13 September 2017, Judeh was invited by the United Nations Secretary-General António Guterres to join the High-Level Advisory Board on Mediation comprising 18 internationally-recognized personalities who will bring experience and skills, deep knowledge and extensive contacts to this extremely important task. In 2019, Guterres appointed him as one of eight members of the High Level-Panel on Internal Displacement under the leadership of Federica Mogherini and Donald Kaberuka.

He was announced as a centennial fellow at the School of Foreign Service of Georgetown University, his alma mater.

Judeh is the honorary co-chair of the binational Fulbright commission in Jordan.

== Decorations ==
- The Grand Cordon of the Order of Al Kawkab – Jordan
- The Grand Cordon of the Order of Al-Istiklal – Jordan
- Commander of the Order of Al-Istiklal – Jordan
- Order of Officer of the Legion of Honour – France
- Grand Officer of the Order of Orange-Nassau – Netherlands
- Knight Commander of the Order of Civil Merit – Spain (2018)
- Grand Cordon of the Order of the Rising Sun – Japan (2019)

== Personal life ==
Judeh was married to Princess Sumaya bint Hassan, a daughter of Prince Hassan bin Talal, uncle of King Abdullah II. They have four children: twins, Tariq and Zein (born 1994), Ali (born 1996) and Sukayna (born 1998).

== See also ==
- List of foreign ministers in 2017

Political offices
Preceded by Salah Bashir	Foreign Minister of Jordan; 23 February 2009 – 15 January 2017	Succeeded by Ayman Safadi
