= Khaled Kalaldeh =

Jordanian politician (born 1955)

Chairman of the Board of Commissioners of the Independent High Electoral Commission (IHEC), Minister of Political and Parliamentary Affairs

Minister of Political and Parliamentary Affairs

Personal details
- Born: 1955 (age 70–71)

Khaled Kalaldeh (born; 1955) is a Jordanian politician, who has served as the chairman of the Board of Commissioners of the Independent High Electoral Commission (IHEC) and the Minister of Political and Parliamentary Affairs.

== Career ==
Kalaldeh has had a long and varied career in Jordanian politics. He served as chairman of the Board of Commissioners of the Independent High Electoral Commission (IHEC) for a non-renewable term of six years. During its tenure, IEC achieved significant achievements and developed remarkable expertise. It organized the 2016 and 2020 parliamentary elections and, the 2017 and 2022 municipal and gubernatorial council elections, in addition to the Chambers of Commerce and Industry elections.

Kalaldeh also served as Minister of Political and Parliamentary Affairs. In this role, he emphasized the important role of political parties in strengthening democracy and creating political awareness. He also highlighted the challenges facing the national economy due to Jordan's reform drive and regional developments.

== Political beliefs and achievements ==
Kalaldeh has been a supporter of political reform in Jordan. He has been involved in the creation and implementation of several reform-oriented laws, including the Municipalities and Decentralization Acts. He also outlined the salient features of the new election bill, which was sent to the lower house.

He believes in the importance of cooperation between the legislative and executive powers. He called for more cooperation between these two branches of government.

== International relations ==
In November 2015, Kalaldeh praised the deep ties between Jordan and Qatar. In June 2014, he has also met with US officials to discuss Jordan's reform process.

== Entrepreneurship ==
Apart from his political career, Kalaldeh is also a seasoned entrepreneur. With over 20 years of leadership, entrepreneurship and innovation skills, Khalid leads Nftania to identify and authenticate assets through Natural Fingerprint Technology (NFP).
