= German Jordanian University =

Public university in Jordan

- الجامعة الألمانية الأردنية
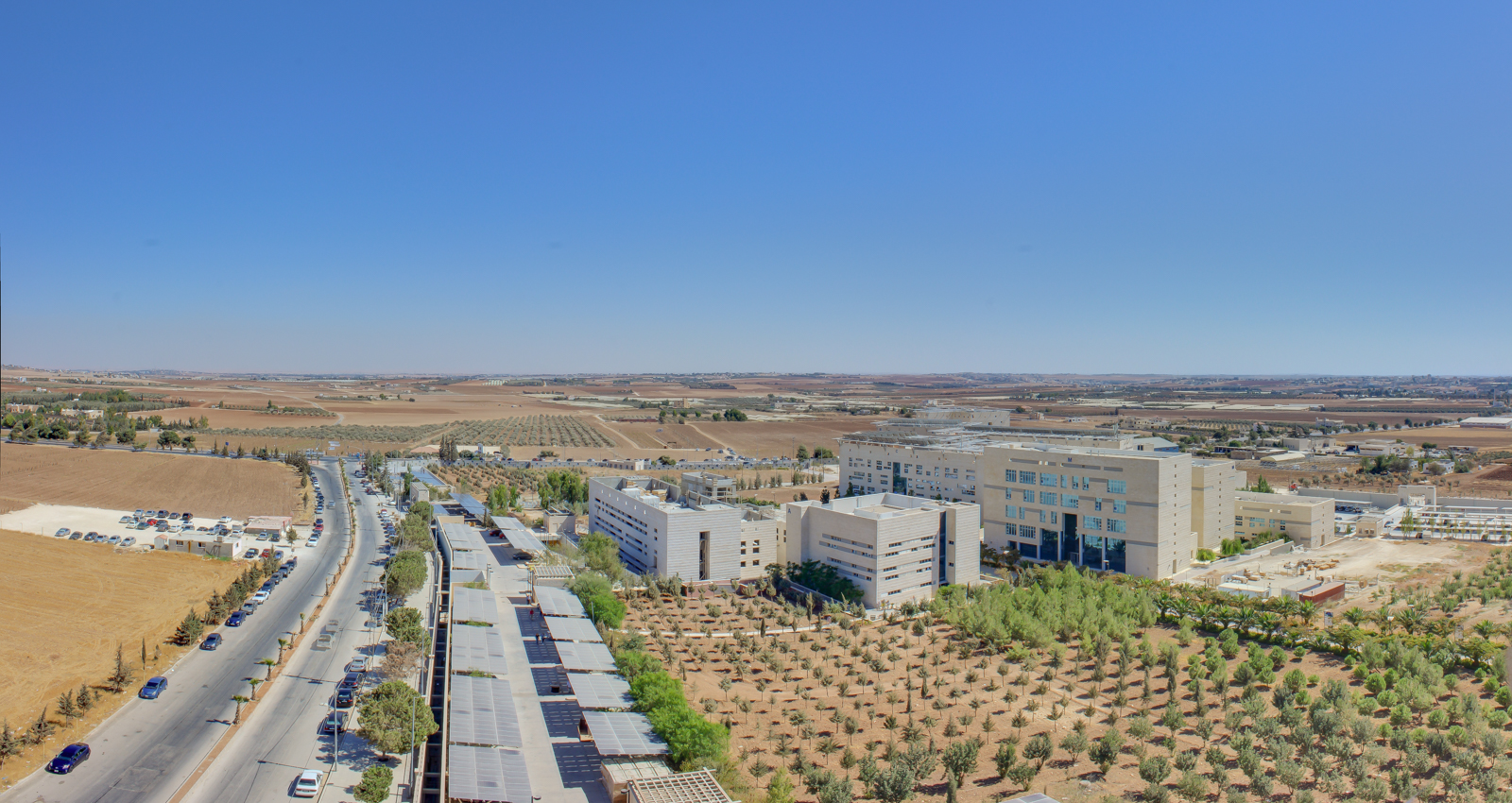
- German Jordanian University in 2017
- Other name: GJU
- Type: Public
- Established: 2005
- Chairman: Othman Bdeir
- President: Ala Aldeen Al-Halhouli
- Undergraduates: 2,801, 71% female
- Location: Near Amman, Jordan; 32°1′32″N 35°52′38″E
- Website: www.gju.edu.jo

German-Jordanian University (GJU) is a public university located near Madaba, Jordan. It offers more than 20 programs to over 6,000 students, primarily from Jordan and the Middle East. The curriculum differs from other Jordanian universities, with German language courses offered as preparation for the fourth academic year at a university of applied sciences in Germany and an introduction to German industry through an obligatory internship within the framework of the study program.

== History ==
In August 2004 a founding committee, in cooperation with Jordan's Ministry of Higher Education and Scientific Research, began its activities in Jordan. The university's programs are designed to encourage the training of young professionals to move back and forth between Europe and the Middle East. GJU was founded on April 25, 2005, by royal decree, in accordance with a Memorandum of Understanding between the Ministry of Higher Education and Scientific Research of the Hashemite Kingdom of Jordan and the Federal Ministry of Education and Research of the Federal Republic of Germany.

His Majesty King Abdullah II, in the presence of Her Majesty Queen Rania Al Abdullah, inaugurated the permanent site of the German Jordanian University in Al-Mushqar, near Madaba.

Prof. Manar Fayyad was appointed president of the university in 2017, after being its vice-president from 2013 to 2017.

Prof. Ala’aldeen Al-Halhouli was appointed the President of the German Jordanian University as of August 23, 2021 By a Royal Decree. Al-Halhouli was a professor at the School of Applied Technical Sciences (SATS) and the Dean of the School of Applied Humanities and Languages (SAHL) at GJU. He also held the position of the President of the Middle East University in Jordan in 2019.

== Campuses ==
GJU comprises two campuses in Jordan.

University rankings

Global – Overall
- QS World: 801-850 (2026)

Main Campus in Amman Madaba Street, Madaba’s campus offers a range of undergraduate courses. It contains Seven Schools. All Departments, Offices, the Library, Four Centers, three Deanships run from the Main Campus.

Jabal Amman Campus: located in downtown Amman, includes the School of Architecture and Built Environment (SABE), three centers and Deanship of Graduate Studies, Library, Student Affairs office, and the German Lounge/Dialogpunkt. Darat Othman Bdeir Campus in Jabal Amman is part of GJU’s School of Architecture and the Built Environment and was completed in 2010 by architects Yasser Rajjal and Anwar Ghaith. The 3,600 m² project rehabilitated heritage buildings into studios, labs, lecture halls, and offices, establishing a model for integrated urban academic campuses in Jordan.

== Board of Trustees ==
The Board of Trustees of the German Jordanian University (GJU) serves as the university’s highest governing body. It is responsible for setting general policies, approving strategic and annual plans, and overseeing their implementation. The board also evaluates the university’s academic, administrative, financial, and infrastructural performance through regular self-assessment reports.

The board consists of twelve members, including the president of the board, four professors from other universities, three members from the trade and industry sector, four expert members, and the university president. The board meets at least once a month or as needed.

=== Current Members ===
- Eng. Othman Bdeir (Chairman)
- Prof. Ala’aldeen Al-Halhouli (University President)
- Prof. Hanan Malkawi
- Prof. Radwan A. Al-Weshah
- Prof. Laila M. Akhu-Zahey
- Prof. Shuail Haddadin
- Eng. Omar Abu Wishah
- Dr. Duraid Mahasneh
- Mrs. Malak Alakiely
- Mrs. Zeena AlMajali
- H. E. Bernhard Kampmann (German Ambassador)
- Mr. Stefan Bienefeld
- Prof. Andreas Geiger

== German Fachhochschulen (universities of applied sciences) model ==
In cooperation with the Magdeburg-Stendal University of Applied Sciences, the project team joined about 70 German universities of applied sciences into a consortium. Its members design the study programs' curricula, recruit qualified German academic staff and host German students during their year. The consortium is open to additional German-language universities of applied sciences. The five-year study programs at GJU follow the model of the German Fachhochschulen (universities of applied sciences), with their philosophy of industry-based practice and an application-oriented approach to knowledge. A large percentage of German professors comprise the academic staff, and courses in German and English as a foreign language are offered to encourage fluency. After an initial phase in English, program courses are taught predominantly in German.

All the students spend one year in Germany, 50% within a partner university, 50% within a company.

== Campuses ==
GJU comprises two campuses in Jordan, the Main Campus in Amman Madaba Street and the Jabal Amman Campus located in downtown Amman. The latter offers the School of Architecture and Built Environment, as well as postgraduate studies and Master's programs.

== German Year ==
Bachelor students must travel to Germany for one year. This is called the German Year. Students spend two semesters there; the first is a study semester and the second is for internship. GJU has partnerships with German universities and industries to facilitate these activities.

== Dual Studies Program ==
GJU launched its first Dual Studies track in 2018 to bridge the gap between theoretical education and practical experience with the support of the German government implemented through giz. Since then 13 majors were incorporated with Dual Studies Programs in business school, computer science and engineering, school of applied technical Sciences, chemical and pharmaceutical engineering, architecture and built environment, design and visual communication, English and German for business and communication. GJU has expanded its industrial partnerships to support the program where the number of companies has reached 79.

== Notable alumni ==
- Maha Ali, former Jordanian Minister of Industry, Trade and Supply
- Farah Nafi (2017), engineer and basketball club captain

== See also ==
- List of Islamic educational institutions
