= Secretary General of the Ministry of Industry, Trade and Supply =

Jordan government official

The Secretary General of the Ministry of Industry, Trade and Supply of Jordan is the chief administrative officer of the ministry.

The Secretary General reports to the Minister of Industry, Trade and Supply, and typically oversees the ministry's daily duties, projects and operations.
