= Ayman Majali =

Jordanian politician

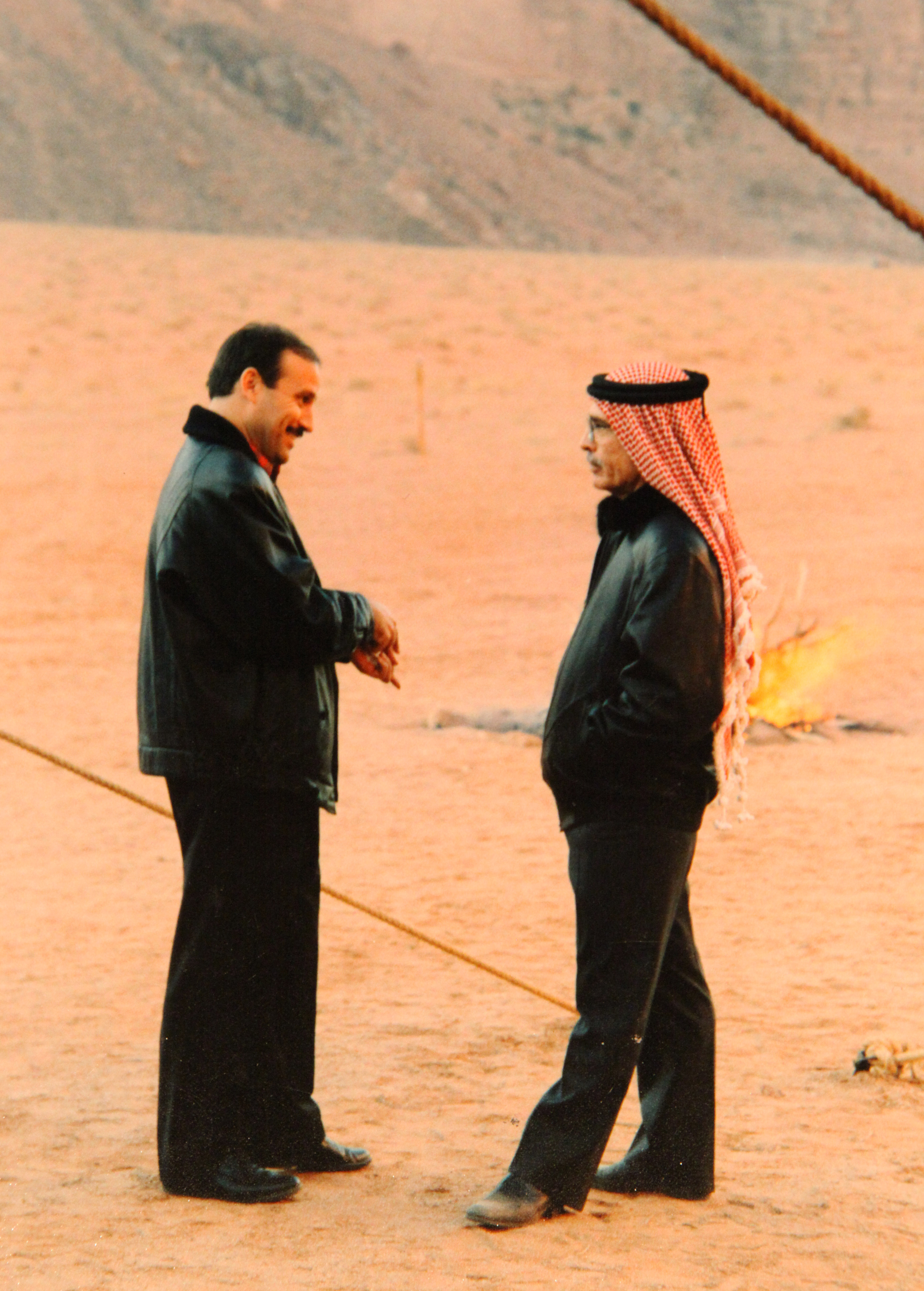
- Ayman Majali (left) King Hussein of Jordan (right)

Deputy Prime Minister
- In office 15 January 2000 – 18 June 2000

Minister of Information & Minister of Youth
- In office 1 September 1999 – 18 June 2000

Chief Of Royal Protocol
- In office 1993–1999

Member Of Parliament
- In office 2010–2012

Personal details
- Born: 20 February 1949 (age 77) Amman, Jordan
- Parent: Hazza' Majali (father)
- Relatives: Hussein Majali (brother); Princess Taghrid (sister); Habis Majali (cousin)
- Education: Lebanese University

Ayman Hazza' al-Majali (Arabic: أيمن هزاع المجالي) is the former Deputy Prime Minister of the Hashemite Kingdom of Jordan. He is the son of Jordan's late Premier Hazza' al-Majali. As a Member of Jordan's House of Representatives he also headed the parliament's Lower House Finance Committee.

== Career ==
Al-Majali received his bachelor's degree in history from the Lebanese University in 1973. He began his political career working in the Jordanian Foreign Ministry before he became an attache at the Jordanian Embassy in Washington. In 1976 al-Majali returned to Jordan and was appointed acting Chief of Protocol for the foreign ministry until 1980 when he became the director of the office of Queen Noor of Jordan. In 1993 king Hussein of Jordan appointed al-Majali as his Chief of Royal Protocol and with time he became one of the Kings top advisers.

After the king's death in 1999, King Abdullah II heir to Jordan's throne, appointed al-Majali as Deputy Prime Minister during the government of Prime Minister Abdelraouf al-Rawabdeh on March 4.

In 2010 al-Majali won the Jordanian Parliamentary elections and became a Member of Parliament representing the city of Al Karak. He was then elected head of Jordan's Lower House Finance Committee.

== Family ==
He is one of five children born to late Jordanian Prime Minister Hazza' al-Majali. His eldest brother, Amjad Hazza' al-Majali, served as the Jordanian Ambassador in Bahrain and Greece, and eventually became Minister of Labor during the government of Ali Abu al-Ragheb. His brother, Lt. Gen. Hussein Al-Majali, was the Minister of Municipal and Rural affairs. His sister Princess Taghrid, is married to Prince Muhammad bin Talal, the brother of King Hussein and uncle of King Abdullah II.

Majali married Flare Zawati, daughter of Palestinian politician Adel Zawati, and has four children including Nasser Majali, who currently serves as Secretary General for the Islamic Solidarity Sports Association.
