= Reem Abu Hassan =

Jordanian politician

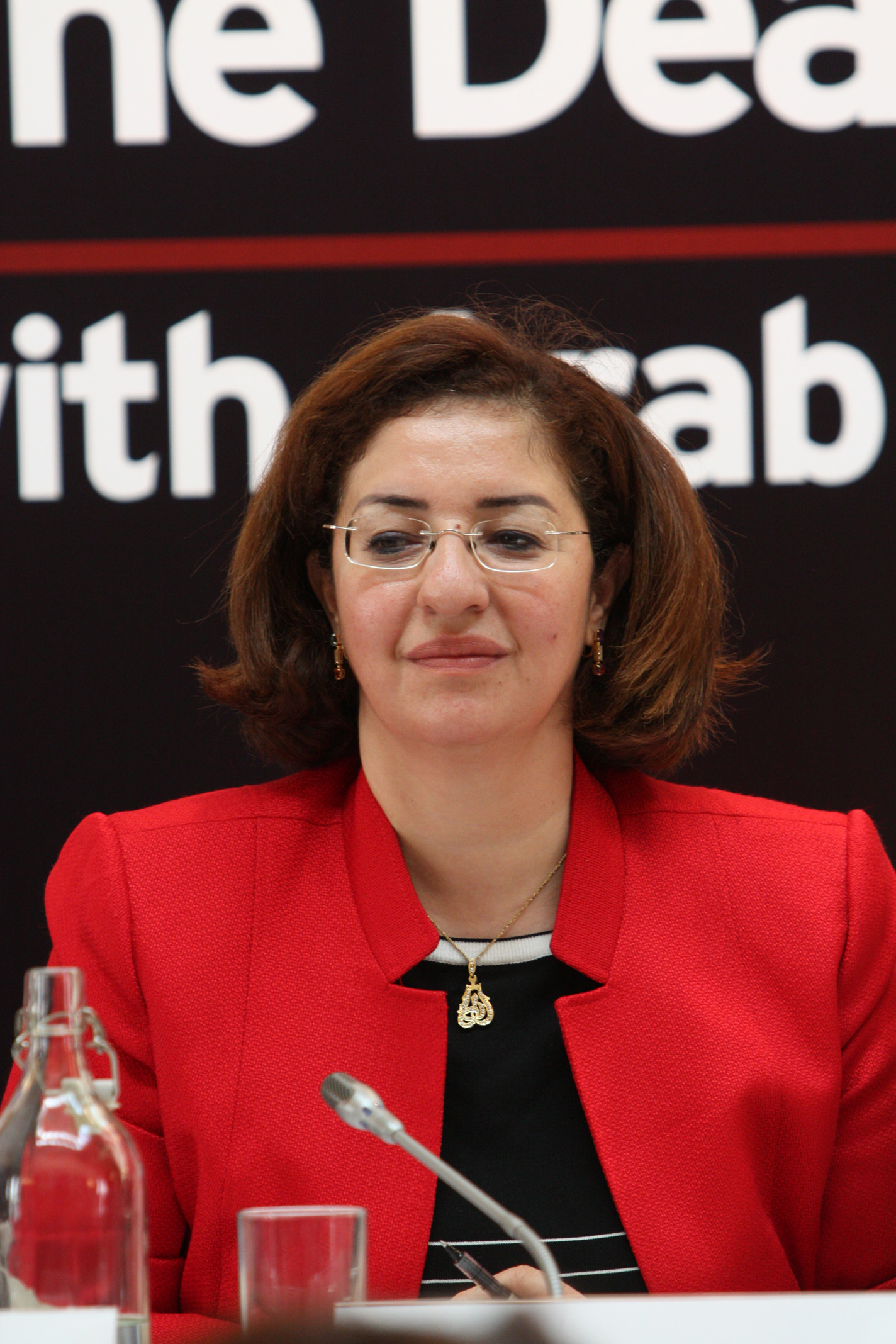

Minister of Social Development
- In office 2013–2016

Reem Abu Hassan (Arabic: ريم أبو حسان) is a Jordanian politician and Government Minister. She has served as the Jordanian Minister of Social Development from 2013 to 2016, which advocates for the welfare of marginalized people in civil society.

Before this, she served as the Secretary General of the National Council for Family Affairs (NCFA), which promotes the "family unit" in Jordanian society.

== Early life ==
Reem Abu Hassan graduated from the University of Jordan with an L.L.B. degree in 1985. In 1986 she completed her L.L.M. from the London School of Economics, University of London. From 1987 to 1988 she was a visiting researcher of Law of Evidence at the Harvard Law School. She is married with two children.

== Career ==
Reem Abu Hassan started her career with the drafting of laws regarding women and children in Jordan in 1992. She worked in the First Reform Initiative in Jordan in 2002 and in 2005 she was a member of the Legislation and Justice subcommittee of the Jordanian National Agenda. In 2006 she participated in the Jordan Together Reform Forum. She served as an advisor to the Ministry of Justice from 2006 to 2008. She founded the International Women's Forum in Jordan and served as its president from 2006 to 2008. She was appointed to the board of trustees for the National Centre for Human Rights in May 2011. In 2013 she was appointed the Minister of Social Development. She has spoken against the scrapping of the Article 308 of the Jordanian law, that protects rapists by through marriage. She was in favor of an amendment to the law that would exclude rapists.

== Activism ==
She has campaigned for and written about adults with autism in the Jordan Times, as a "collective responsibility" and a public health issue. Among her important social issues is the accommodation of citizens with autism, and their integration into society.
