= Hussein Majali =

Jordanian general and minister

Minister of Interior
- In office 30 March 2013 – 17 May 2015
- Succeeded by: Salameh Hammad

Public Security Directorate
- In office May 2010 – 30 March 2013

Personal details
- Born: 24 January 1960 (age 66) Amman, Jordan
- Parent: Hazza' Majali (father)
- Relatives: Ayman Majali (brother); Princess Taghrid (sister); Habis Majali (cousin)

Hussein Hazza' Majali (Arabic: حسين هزاع المجالي; born 24 January 1960) is a Jordanian general and a former minister who served as Jordan's Interior Minister and Minister of Municipal and Rural Affairs from 30 March 2013 to 17 May 2015.

== Early life and education ==
He was born in Amman in Jordan in 1960, the year his father Prime Minister Hazza' Majali was assassinated. His brother, former deputy prime minister Ayman Majali currently serves as a member of the Jordanian parliament.

Majali was commissioned on 23 January 1982 as a lieutenant. He holds a bachelor's degree in political sciences from The Citadel, The Military College of South Carolina (1981), and a bachelor and a Master of Science in military sciences, from Mutah University, Jordan. He speaks Arabic, English and French.

== Career ==
Majali worked in many military positions, progressing to the rank of major general. Most notably, he held the position of the commandant of Royal Guards at the time of the late Hussein of Jordan. He was decommissioned in 2002. He was appointed in 2005 as the ambassador of Jordan to Bahrain, a position he held until 9 September 2010 when he was commissioned as the commandant of public security forces, after Lieutenant General Mazen Al-Qadi was decommissioned. On 13 December the same year, Majali was promoted to the rank of lieutenant general.

He was made Interior Minister in the new government of Abdullah Ensour in March 2013.

He resigned on 17 May 2015 after a police raid in the city of Ma'an, of which civilians accused the security forces of using excessive force. The head of police, Tawfik al-Tawabla and the head of the gendarmerie Ahmed al-Swelmin were retired after the incident. Majali was replaced as Minister by Salameh Hammad on 19 May.
