= Mohammad Qudah =

Jordanian politician

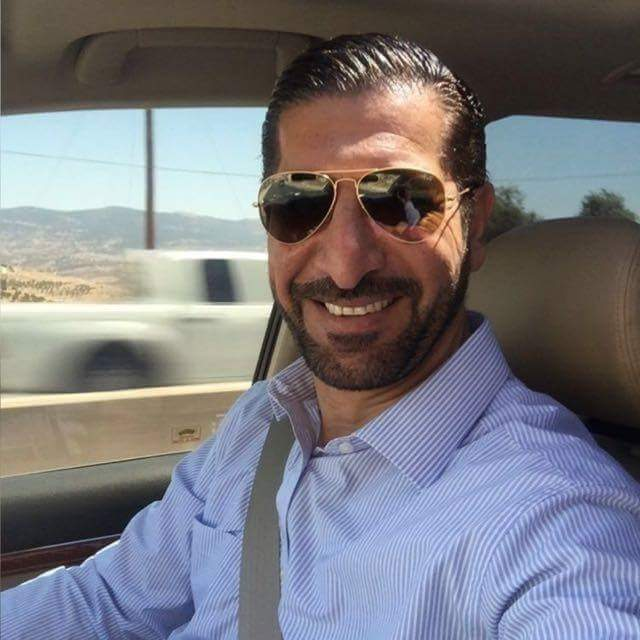

Minister of Awqaf and Islamic Affairs

Personal details
- Parent: Nuh al-Qudah (father)

Mohammad Qudah is a Jordanian politician who has served in various capacities within the Jordanian government. Qudah has held several key positions, including serving as the Minister of Awqaf and Islamic Affairs during a government reshuffle led by Prime Minister Hani Mulki.
