= World Islamic Sciences and Education University =

Islamic university in Amman, Jordan

The World Islamic Science & Education University (The WISE University or W.I.S.E)
- جامعة العلوم الإسلامية العالمية
- Type: Public
- Established: 2008
- Affiliations: FUIW, AArU
- Chairman: HRH Prince Ghazi bin Muhammad, The Grandson of King Talal of Jordan
- President: Prof. Jaafar Al-Fanatseh (Acting)
- Location: Amman, Kingdom of Jordan
- Campus: Tabarbour
- Colors: Green and Maroon
- Website: The World Islamic Science & Education University (W.I.S.E)

The World Islamic Science & Education University (The WISE University or W.I.S.E) (Arabic جامعة العلوم الإسلامية العالمية) is an Islamic university in Amman, Jordan that was established in 2008. The university is the permanent seat of the Arabic Language and Nation Identity Conference. It is accredited by the Jordanian Ministry of Higher Education and Scientific Research.

== Location ==
The WISE campus is at three locations:

- District Tariq (Tariq Hayy) Amman, for the Faculty of Dawa and Ushuluddien, Faculty of Sharia and Law, Faculty of Arabic Language and Literature.
- Umm Udzainah District (Duwar Sadis) Amman, for the Faculty of Arts and Islamic Architecture.
- Medina Riyadiyya Amman, for the main campus.

== Faculties ==
- Faculty of Dawa and Usuluddien
- Faculty of Sheikh Noah El-Qudha for Sharia and Law
- Faculty of Arts, Humanities and Educational Science
- Faculty of Traditional Islamic Art and Architecture
- Faculty of Information Technology
- Faculty of Business and Finance
- Faculty of Basic Sciences
- Faculty of Higher Studies
- Higher Institute for Quranic Studies and Recitation

=== Faculty of Dawa and Usuluddien (Theology) ===
The Faculty of Dawa and Usuluddien has two departments:

- Department of Usuluddien (Theology), has three major studies:
  - Faith and Islamic Philosophy
    - Bachelor in Usuluddien (Theology)
    - Master in Faith and Islamic Philosophy
    - Ph.D. in Faith and Islamic Philosophy
  - Quranic Sciences and Interpretation
    - Master in Quranic Sciences and Interpretation
    - Ph.D. in Faith and Islamic Philosophy
  - Hadeeth and Its Sciences
    - Master in Hadeeth and Its Sciences
    - Ph.D. in Hadeeth and Its Sciences
- Department of Dawa and Islamic Studies, has two major studies:
  - Dawa (Bachelor)
  - Islamic Media (Bachelor)

=== Faculty of Sheikh Noah El-Qudha for Sharia and Law ===
The Faculty of Sheikh Noah El-Qudha for Sharia and Law has three departments:

- Department of Comparative Law (Bachelor, Master and Phd)
  - Bachelor in Sharia and Law
  - Bachelor in Law
  - Ph.D. in Sharia Courts
  - Ph.D. in Specific Law
  - Ph.D. in Public Law
- Department of Islamic Jurisprudence
  - Bachelor in Islamic Jurisprudence
  - Ph.D. in Islamic Jurisprudence

=== Faculty of Arts, Humanities and Educational Science ===
The Faculty of Arts, Humanities and Educational Science has four departments:

- Department of Arabic Language and Literature
  - Bachelor in Arabic Language and Literature
  - Bachelor, Master and Ph.D. in Linguistic Studies
- Department of English and Literature
  - Bachelor in English and Literature
- Department of Humanities
  - Bachelor in Child-rearing
  - Bachelor in Counseling and Mental Health
  - Bachelor in Special Education
  - Bachelor in Social Studies
  - Master in Special Education
  - Ph.D. in Special Education
  - Bachelor, Master and Ph.D. in Literary and Critical Studies
- Department of Educational Sciences
  - Diploma in Education
  - Master in Curriculum and Teaching Methods
  - Ph.D. in Curriculum and Teaching Methods

=== Faculty of Traditional Islamic Art and Architecture ===
The Faculty of Traditional Islamic Art and Architecture has three departments:

- Department of Islamic Art.
  - Bachelor's and Master's Degree in Islamic Art.
- Department of Interior Design.
  - Bachelor's and Master's Degree in Interior Design.
- Department of Islamic architecture.
  - Bachelor in Project Management.
  - Master in Islamic architecture.

=== Faculty of Information Technology ===
The Faculty of Information Technology has two departments:

- Department of Computer Scien.
- Department of information systems and networks.

The faculty include the following disciplines:

- Computer Science.
- Computer Information Systems.
- Managing Computer Networks.
- Software Engineering.

=== Faculty of Business and Finance ===
The Faculty of Business and Finance has three departments:

- Department of Economics, Finance and Banking.
- Department of Islamic Banking.
- Department of Administration.
- Department of Accounting.

The college include the following disciplines:

- Bachelor's and Doctoral Degrees in Accounting.
- Bachelor's and Ph.D. in Business Administration.
- MSc and Ph.D. in Islamic Banking
- Bachelor of Banking and Finance.
- Bachelor of Management Information Systems.
- Master's and Doctoral degree in Administration

=== Faculty of Basic Sciences ===
The college include the following disciplines (Diploma) in:

- Islamic Sciences
- Finance and Administrative
- Educational Sciences
- English
- Arabic
- Information Technology
- Islamic Art
- Interior Design

== Centers ==
- Computer and Information Center
- Arabic Language Center for Speakers of other Languages
- The Language Center
- Consultation, Training, Planning and Development Center
- The Center for the Rehabilitation of Imams and Preachers
- E-Learning Center

== See also ==
- List of Islamic educational institutions
- College of Islamic Studies
- College of Law and Shari'a
- College of Arabic Language and Literature
