= Ministry of Tourism and Antiquities (Jordan) =

Government ministry of Jordan

Hashemite Kingdom of Jordan Ministry of Antiquities
- وزارة السياحة والآثار وزارة السياحة والآثار; Wizarat Al-Siyaha wal-Athar
- Emblem of Jordan

Agency overview
- Jurisdiction: Government of Jordan
- Headquarters: Amman, Jordan
- Agency executive: Minister
- Child agency: Antiquities Repatriation
- Website: mota.gov.jo

The Ministry of Tourism and Antiquities (Arabic: وزارة السياحة والآثار) is a government ministry of Jordan that oversees tourism policy and matters related to antiquities. The ministry became a cabinet-level body in 1967, when a royal decree elevated the tourism authority and brought the Department of Antiquities under its remit. Its headquarters are at the Third Circle in Jabal Amman, Amman.

The ministry regulates parts of the tourism sector through by-laws and regulations. Under the 2025 system for tourism and travel offices and companies, tourism and travel services covered by the regulation may be practiced only after the office/company is classified by the Ministry of Tourism and Antiquities. Tourism is a significant contributor to Jordan's economy; official figures reported tourism's contribution at 14.6% of GDP in 2023. In 2025, the Cabinet approved regulations that replaced licensing requirements for hotel/tourism establishments and tourist restaurants with ministry classification or registration approval.

== History ==
The Ministry of Tourism and Antiquities was established in 1967. It is responsible for tourism policy and for matters related to antiquities such as the management and protection of archaeological and heritage sites.

The Ministry has undergone several name changes over the years. In 1967, 57 years ago, it was known as the Ministry of Tourism (Arabic: وزارة السياحة, romanized: Wizarat Al-Siyaha). By 1981, 43 years ago, it was renamed as the Ministry of Tourism, Antiquities (Arabic: وزارة السياحة والآثار والثقافة والشباب, romanized: Wizarat Al-Siyaha wal-Athar wal-Thaqafa wal-Shabab). A year later, in 1982, 42 years ago, it became the Ministry of Industry and Trade (Arabic: وزارة الصناعة والتجارة, romanized: Wizarat Al-Sina'a wal-Tijara). In 1985, 39 years ago, it was rebranded as the Ministry of Information, Culture, and Tourism (Arabic: وزارة الإعلام والثقافة والسياحة, romanized: Wizarat Al-I'lam wal-Thaqafa wal-Siyaha). Then, in 1988, 36 years ago, it returned to being the Ministry of Tourism (Arabic: وزارة السياحة, romanized: Wizarat Al-Siyaha) before being changed again later that same year to the Ministry of Information, Culture, Tourism, and Antiquities (Arabic: وزارة الإعلام والثقافة والسياحة والآثار, romanized: Wizarat Al-I'lam wal-Thaqafa wal-Siyaha wal-Athar). Finally, in 1989, 35 years ago, it settled on the name the Ministry of Tourism and Antiquities (Arabic: وزارة السياحة والآثار, romanized: Wizarat Al-Siyaha wal-Athar).

In 1953, the first bureau responsible for supervising tourism affairs in Jordan was established in Jerusalem and was initially staffed by a small team providing services to pilgrims. In mid-1953, it was upgraded to a department that reported directly to the Prime Minister. In September 1953, the department's headquarters moved to Amman, while a small affiliated office remained in Jerusalem; the department continued to report directly to the Prime Minister.

In 1956, a rest house was built at Ar-Ramtha border crossing with assistance from the International Development Agency. In 1960, the tourism department was reorganized as an administratively and financially independent authority under the Ministry of National Economy. Law No. 17 of 1960 established a council for the tourism authority, chaired by the Prime Minister (or deputy), and set out its membership; it also provided for a consultative council that included representatives of hotels, tourism agencies, airline companies, and chambers of commerce. In 1964, the authority became a department within the Ministry of Tourism while retaining its administrative status as an authority.

In 1967, a royal decree upgraded the tourism authority to a ministry and brought the Department of Antiquities under its umbrella. The administrative placement of the tourism portfolio later changed several times, including periods when it operated as an independent authority under other ministries. In 1975, Tourism Law No. 45 was issued; the ministry's historical overview says the law increased private-sector representation in the authority's council and expanded the authority director's responsibilities. In 1988, tourism was assigned a separate ministerial portfolio again, and Tourism Law No. 20 of 1988 was approved; an accompanying legal framework summary notes that the law replaced the tourism authority with the Ministry of Tourism. In the same year, Antiquities Law No. 21 of 1988 was issued. In 1989, the Department of Antiquities became part of the Ministry of Tourism, which was renamed the Ministry of Tourism and Antiquities.

== Mission and responsibilities ==
The ministry's responsibilities include developing and implementing tourism policy and supporting tourism promotion through official campaigns and programs. It also oversees matters related to antiquities and heritage protection, including the management and safeguarding of archaeological sites and related cultural property, in coordination with the Department of Antiquities and other bodies.

The ministry's policy work includes objectives related to sustainable tourism and the protection of heritage and cultural sites, as set out in the Jordan National Tourism Strategy (2021–2025). A strategic environmental assessment prepared alongside the strategy describes the Ministry of Tourism and Antiquities as the strategy's custodian and notes coordination with the Ministry of Environment and international partners on environmental and social safeguards.

The ministry also issues and applies regulations affecting tourism establishments and services, including classification and registration frameworks for hotels, tourism establishments, and tourist restaurants.

Matters related to antiquities are handled through the Department of Antiquities, which is attached to the ministry at the senior administrative level; the department's mandate includes archaeological policy, excavations, site management, and museums.

== Projects ==
The ministry's policy initiatives include the Jordan National Tourism Strategy 2021–2025, released in December 2021, and a subsequent addendum updating parts of the strategy.

Cultural-heritage work is carried out through the Department of Antiquities and partner projects. For example, the Department of Antiquities lists a project titled "Protection of Cultural Heritage in Jordan" launched in 2017 focused on documenting and preserving archaeological collections at the Jordan Archaeological Museum and storage facilities. Internationally supported heritage-rehabilitation projects have also been implemented in cooperation with the Department of Antiquities and the Ministry of Tourism, including initiatives supported by the European Union and UNESCO in northern Jordan.

Tourism promotion campaigns are typically led by the Jordan Tourism Board (JTB). In 2021, the JTB launched Jordan's tourism brand "Kingdom of Time", and the board later promoted the brand in European markets as part of its international marketing campaigns.

== Notable archaeological sites ==
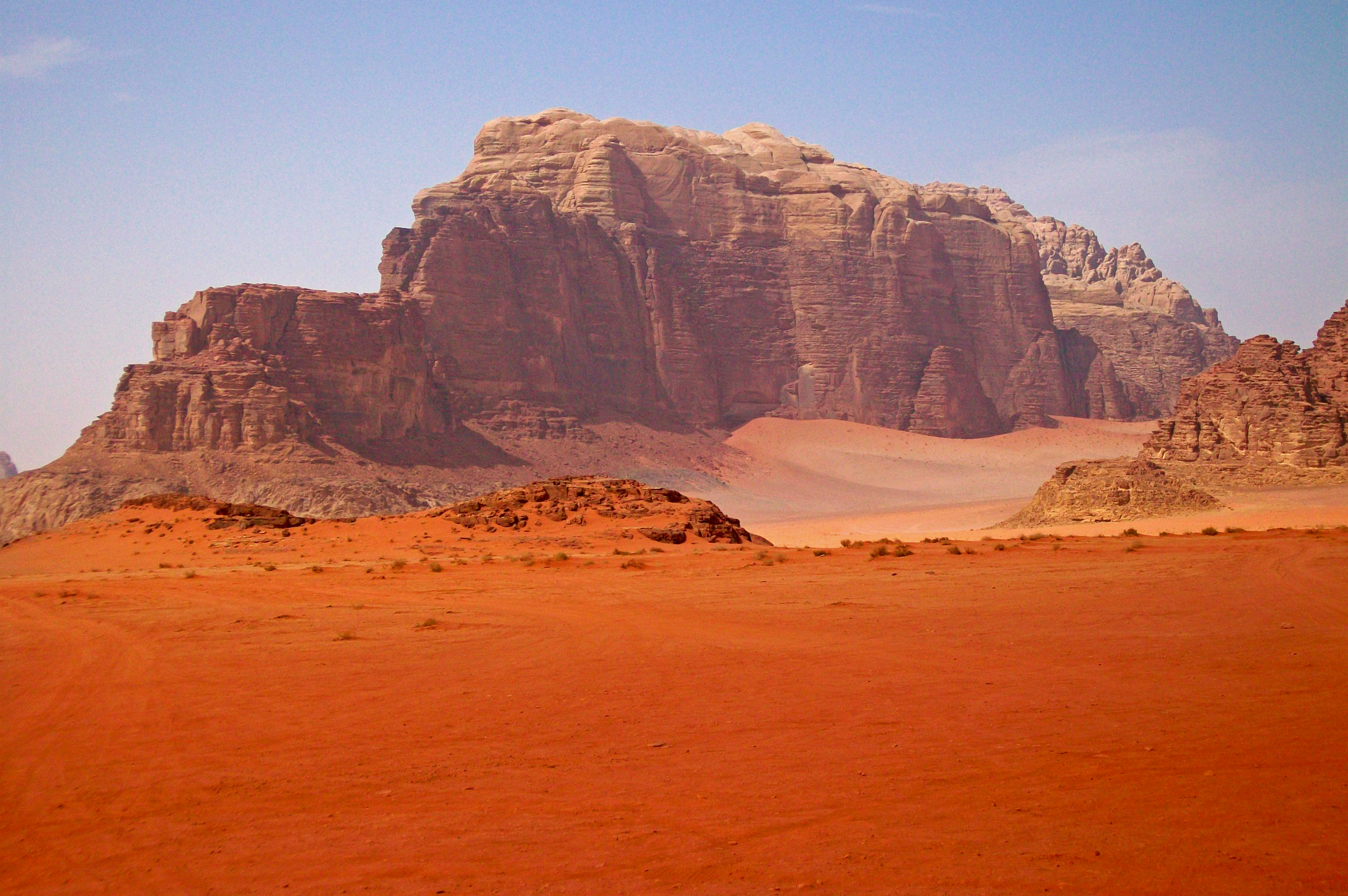
Wadi Rum

Jordan is home to a number of significant archaeological sites under the Ministry's care, including:

- Petra – An archaeological site in southern Jordan (Ma'an Governorate). UNESCO describes Petra as a Nabataean caravan city with rock-cut monuments and an extensive water-management system; it was inscribed on the UNESCO World Heritage List in 1985. Petra became known to many European readers after Johann Ludwig Burckhardt visited the site in 1812. In 2007, it was selected as one of the New7Wonders of the World.

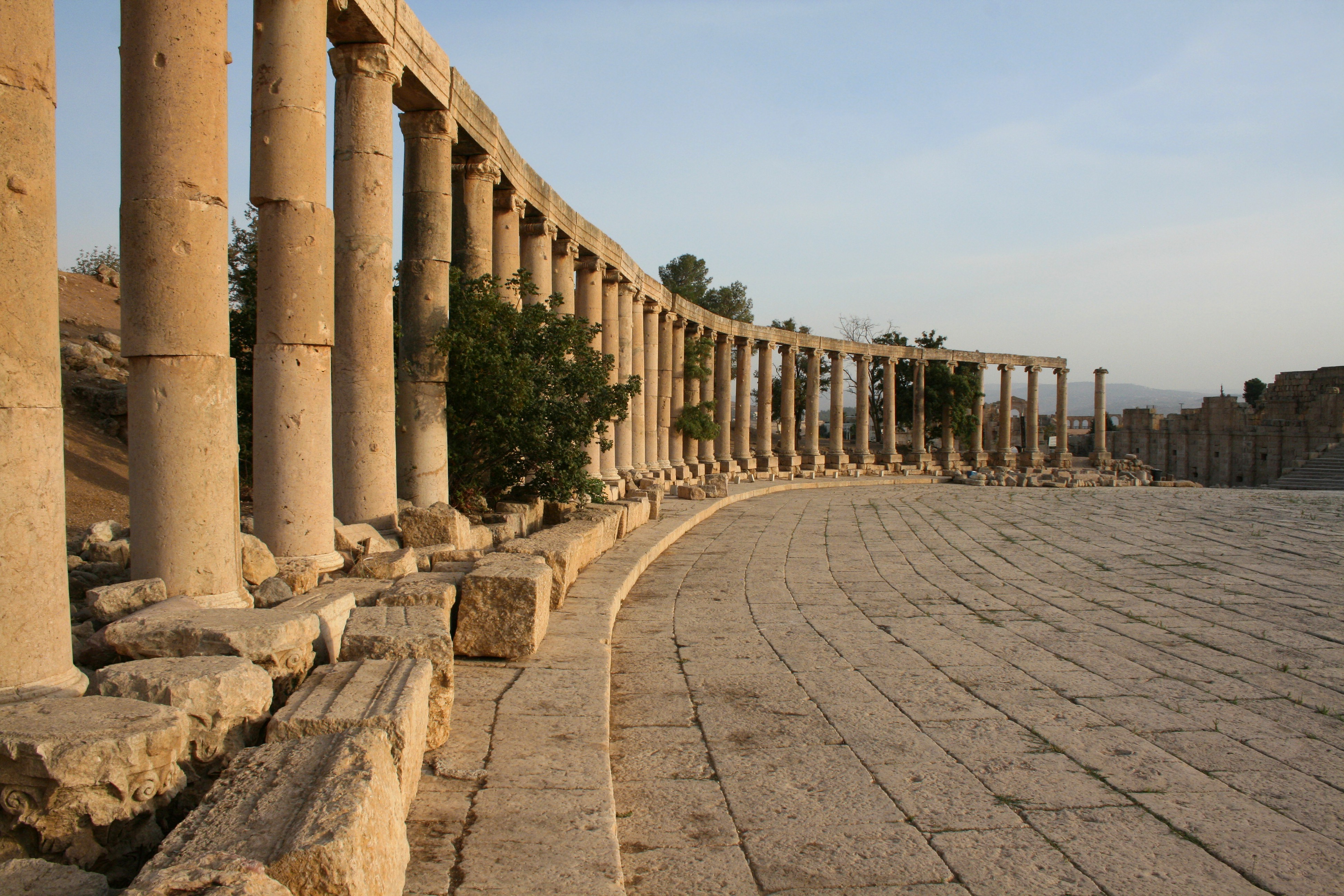
Oval Forum

- Jerash – An archaeological site north of Amman, commonly identified with the ancient city of Gerasa. The Department of Antiquities describes it as one of the best preserved regional Roman-era cities, and notes major features such as the oval forum, colonnaded streets (cardo), theaters, the hippodrome, and the temples of Artemis and Zeus. The city hosts the Jerash Festival of Culture and Arts, a recurring cultural event staged at venues in and around the archaeological site.

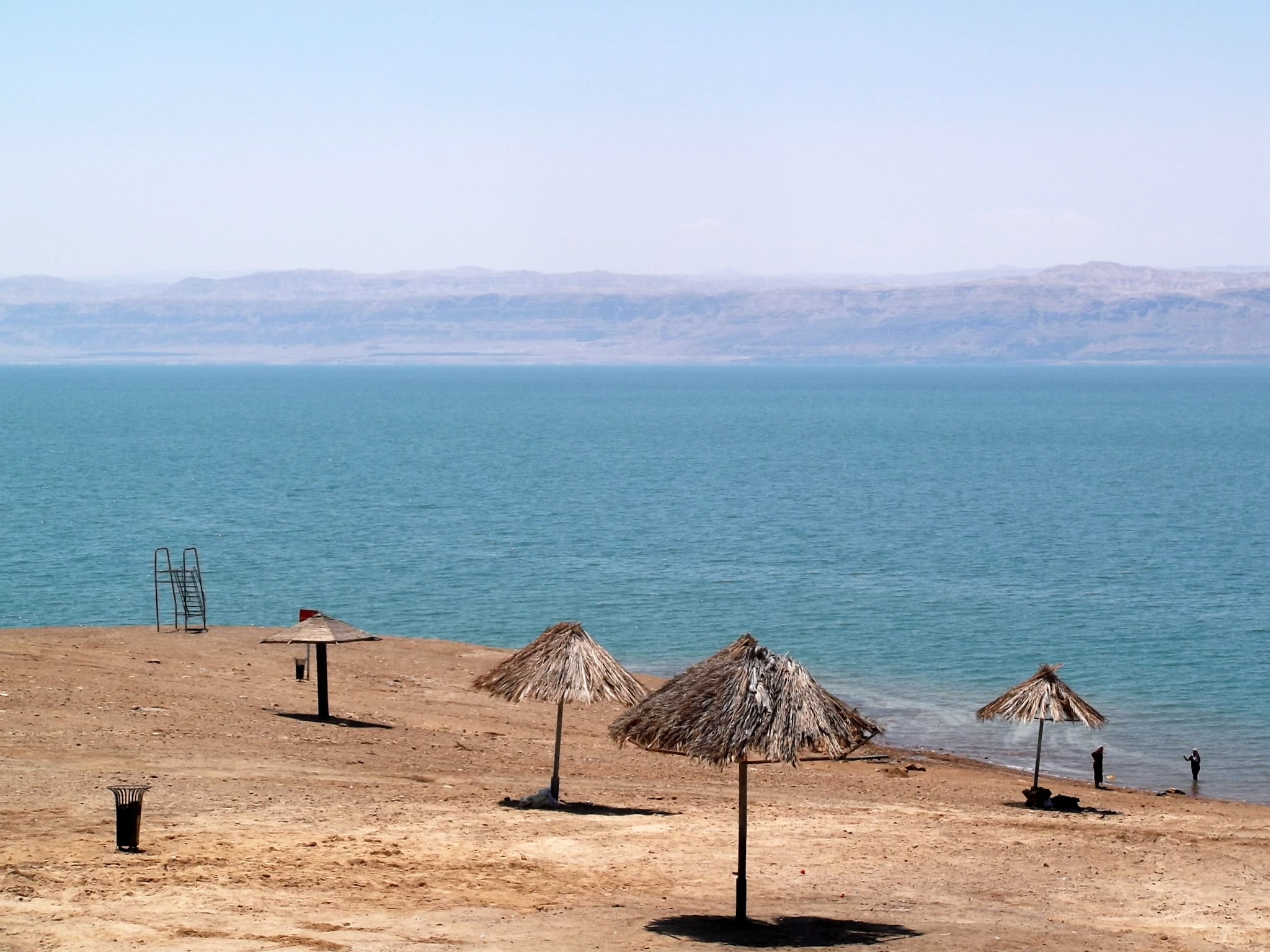
A view of the sea from the Jordanian shore with the hills of the West Bank in the background

- Dead Sea – A landlocked hypersaline lake bordered by Jordan and Israel/West Bank. Its shoreline is the lowest land elevation on Earth. The lake's high salinity gives the water a high density, which makes swimmers notably buoyant.
- Umm Qais (ancient Gadara) – An archaeological site in northern Jordan associated with the ancient city of Gadara, which is described as a member of the Decapolis. The Department of Antiquities has carried out restoration work at the site, including a project focused on the Western amphitheater (a Roman-period structure built of basalt stone).
- Al-Maghtas (Baptism Site “Bethany Beyond the Jordan”) – A UNESCO World Heritage Site on the eastern bank of the River Jordan, north of the Dead Sea. UNESCO's listing describes two main archaeological areas: Tell el-Kharrar (Jabal Mar Elias) and the area of the Churches of St. John the Baptist near the river; it is described as a site believed to be associated with the baptism of Jesus by John the Baptist.

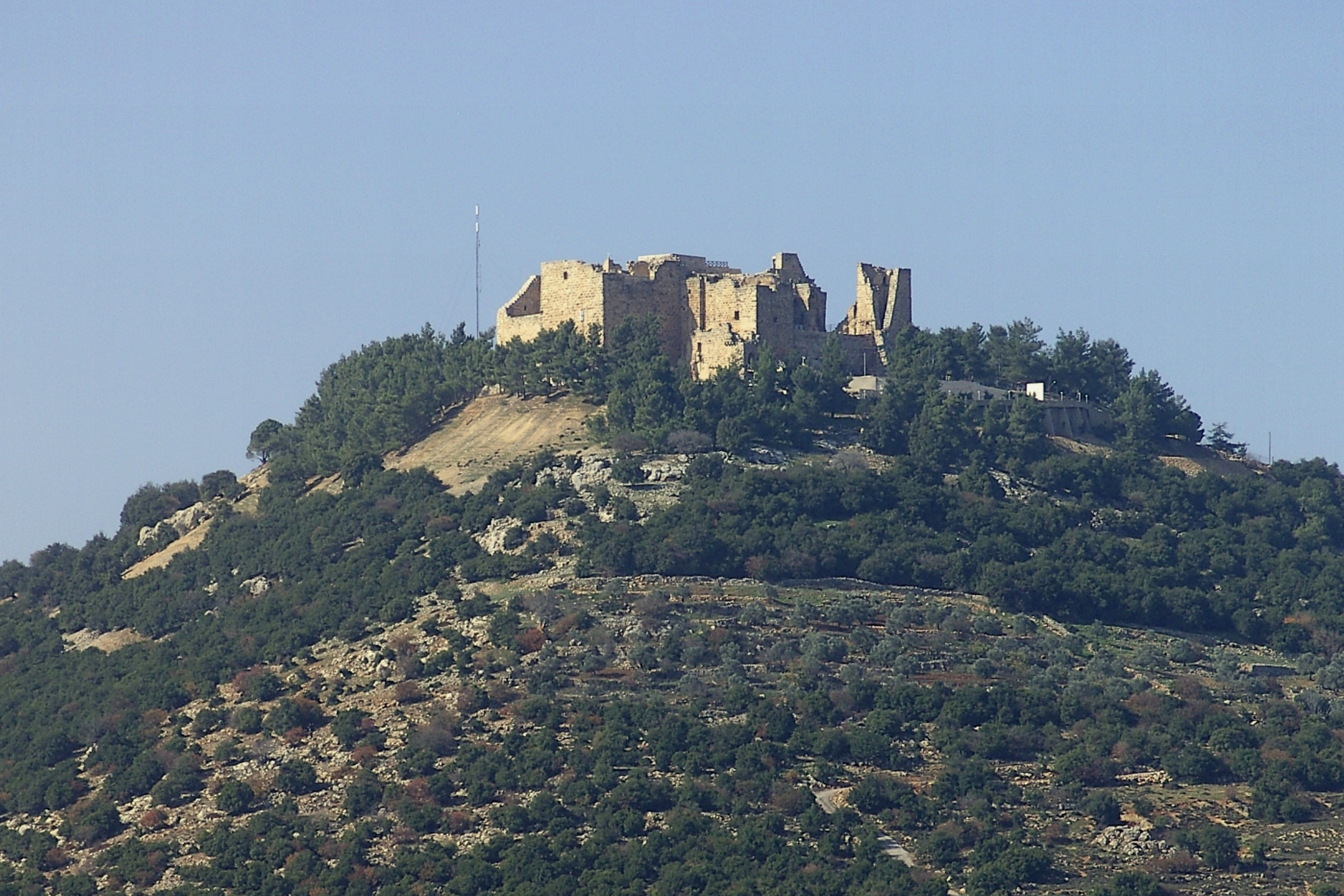
Ajloun Castle in 2009

- Ajloun Castle (Qalʿat ar-Rabad) – A 12th-century hilltop castle in Ajloun Governorate, about 75 km northwest of Amman. The Department of Antiquities states that it was built in 1184 on Mount Bani ʿAwf overlooking the Jordan Valley, on the orders of Salah al-Din (Saladin) and carried out by Izz al-Din Osama ibn Munqidh, with the stated purpose of controlling transport routes between Palestine, Transjordan, and Syria.

The same overview notes that the earliest phase included a square plan with four towers, two entrances, and a rock-cut moat; later phases added towers and included renovations under later rulers, and the castle was used as a military garrison in the Ottoman period. The Ajloun Archaeological Museum is located within the castle and, according to the Jordan Museums portal, was established in 2003.

== Challenges ==
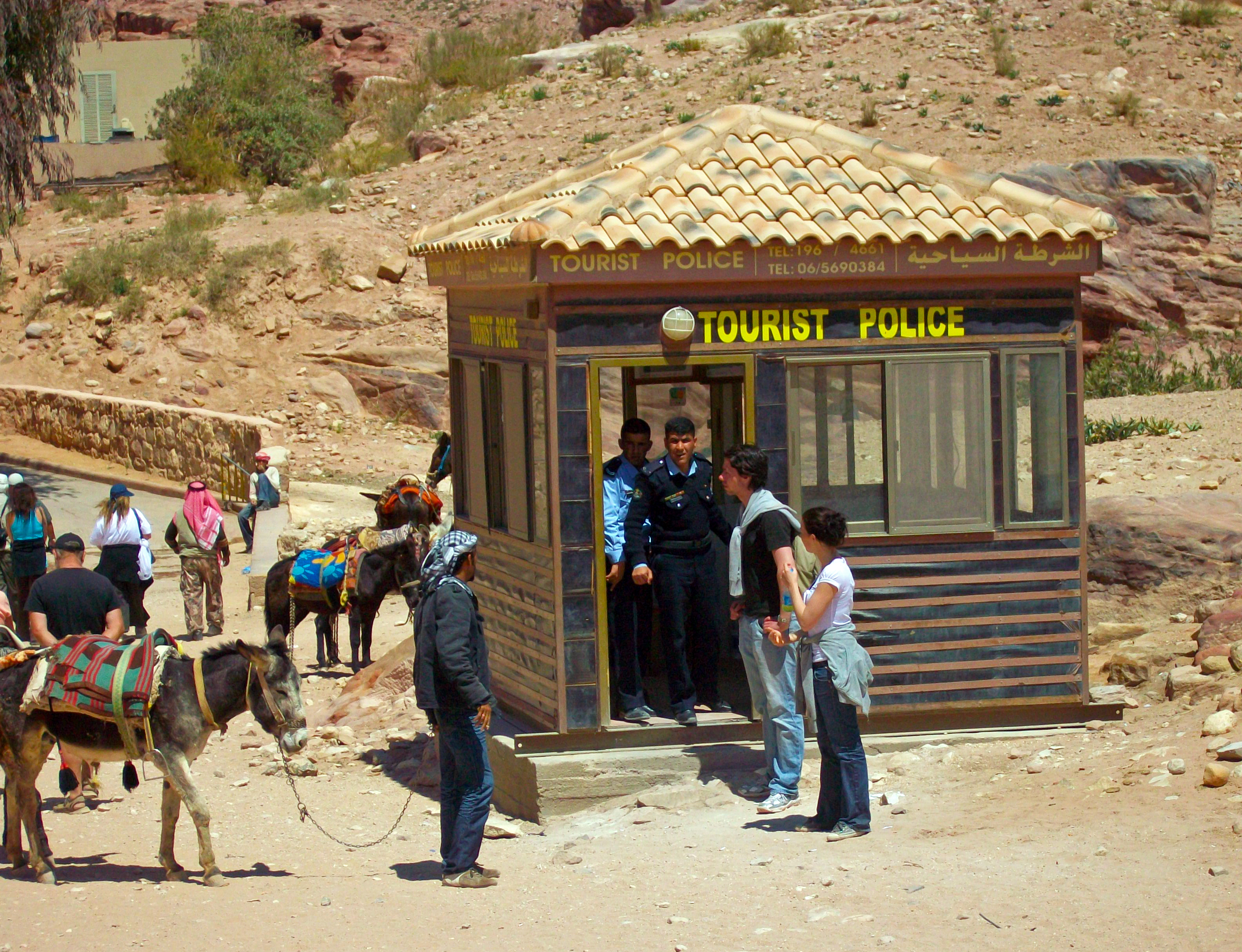
Tourist police kiosk at Petra

Planning documents for the tourism sector have flagged visitor pressure on major heritage sites and the need for stronger visitor-management measures. UNESCO's state of conservation reporting for Petra has referred to crowd-management and carrying-capacity work intended to reduce congestion in high-traffic areas and protect the site's integrity.

Tourism demand has also been affected by regional security shocks. The World Bank's Jordan Economic Monitor (data cut-off July 10, 2024) linked slower growth in 2024 in part to conflict-related impacts on tourism, trade, and transportation.

Environmental and sectoral plans have identified climate-related risks for tourism destinations and called for adaptation measures, including crisis and disaster management planning for the tourism sector.

== See also ==
- Tourism in Jordan
- Petra
- Jerash
- Dead Sea
