= Minister of Industry, Trade and Supply =

The Minister of Industry, Trade and Supply of Jordan is a Cabinet Minister responsible for overseeing internal and external trade.

Alongside this position, the Minister also holds the position of Chairman of the Board of Directors of several government institutions including Jordan Civil Service Consumer Corporation, Jordan Standards and Metrology Organization (JISMO) and the Jordan Enterprise Development Corporation (JEDCO). The current minister is Yousef Shamali.
