= Abdullah Ensour =

Prime minister of Jordan

- عبد الله النسور
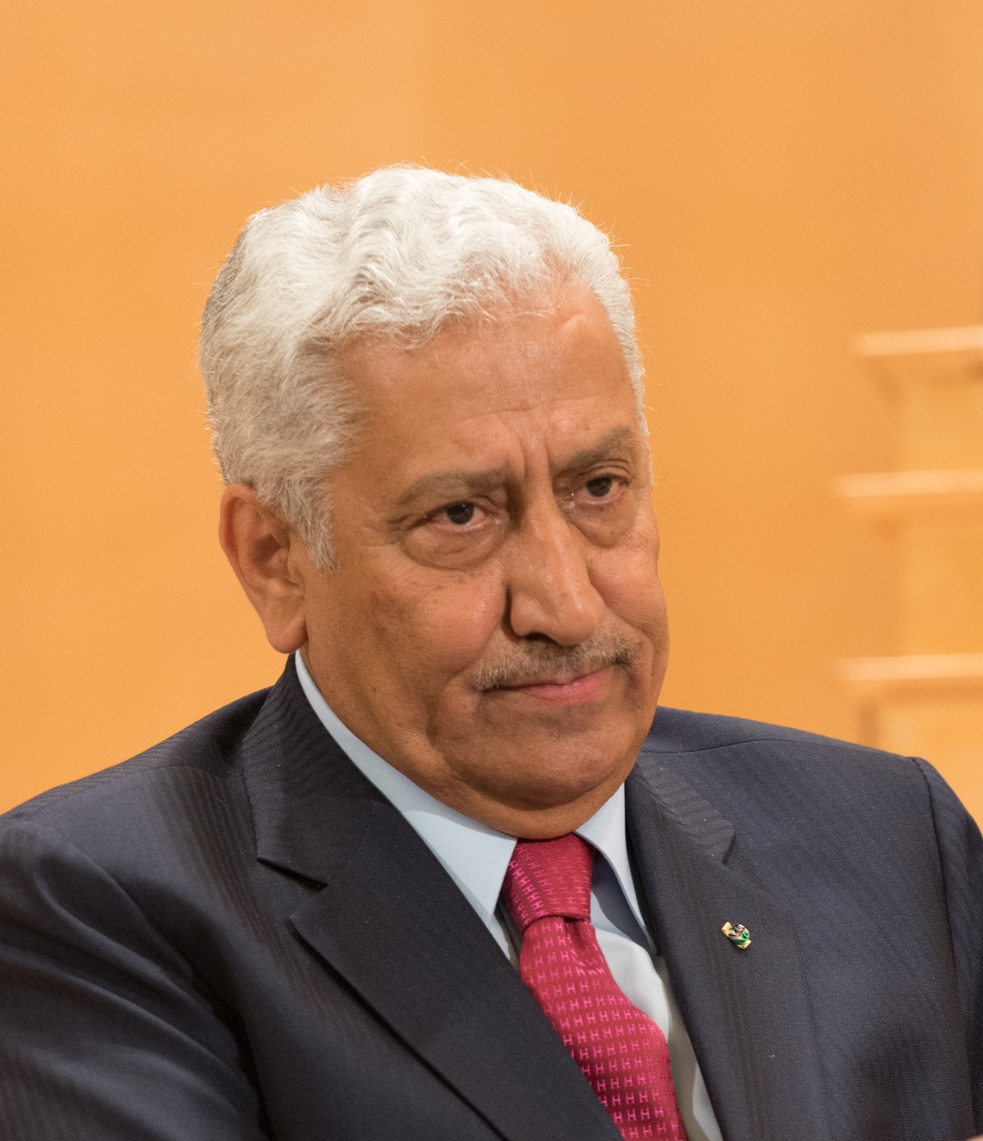
- Ensour in 2014

Prime Minister of Jordan
- In office 10 October 2012 – 1 June 2016
- Monarch: Abdullah II
- Preceded by: Fayez al-Tarawneh
- Succeeded by: Hani Mulki

Personal details
- Born: Abdullah Abdulkarim Hamdan; Ensour; 20 January 1939 (age 87) Salt, Emirate of Transjordan (present-day Jordan)
- Party: Independent
- Spouse: Ibtissam Hiyari
- Children: 8
- Education: American University of Beirut; Pantheon-Sorbonne University University of Michigan

Abdullah Ensour (/ˈɑːbdələ ɛnˈsʊər/ AHB-də-lə en-SOOR; Arabic: عبد الله النسور ʿAbd Allāh an-Nasūr; born 20 January 1939) is a Jordanian economist who served as the 40th prime minister of Jordan between October 2012 and May 2016. A veteran politician, he has held various cabinet positions in Jordanian government in addition to being prime minister.

== Early life ==
Ensour was born in Salt. He studied at the American University of Beirut where he obtained his bachelor's degree in statistics. He then continued to get his master's degree in institutions management, at the University of Michigan in the United States. He also obtained his PhD in planning at the Pantheon-Sorbonne University.

== Positions held, current and previous ==
=== Senatorial posts ===
- Member of the Senate Council 1997–2009 2008–2010 2016–2020 2022–Present

Committees:

- Member of the Finance Committee.
- Member of the Foreign Affairs Committee.

- Member of the House of Representatives 1989–1993 1993–1995 2010–2012

Committees:

- Chairman of the Finance and Economic Committee.
- Member of the Foreign Affairs Committee.
- Member of the Committee on Education and Higher Education.

=== Ministerial positions ===
- Minister of Planning.
- Minister of Education.
- Minister of Foreign Affairs.
- Minister of Industry and Trade.
- Minister of Higher Education.
- Minister of Administrative Development.
- Media Minister.
- Deputy Prime Minister.
- Prime Minister and Minister of Defense.

=== Experiences and memberships, current and previous councils ===
- Director general of the Budget Department.
- The Ministry of Finance Secretary General.
- Director general of the Income Tax Department.
- Governor of Jordan at the World Bank.
- Deputy Governor of Jordan at the International Monetary Fund.
- Jordan's permanent delegate to UNESCO.
- Chairman of the Jordanian-French Business Club Management.
- Member of the Royal Commission National Ajenda.
- Chairman of the Royal Commission to strengthen national integrity system.
- The official spokesman and a member of the Royal Commission for Jordan First.
- Chairman of the Higher Education Council.
- Chairman of the board of trustees of the University of Jordan Zaitouna.
- Vice Chairman of the board of trustees of the University of Science and Technology.
- Vice Chairman of the board of trustees of the Balqa Applied University.
- Vice Chairman of the board of trustees of the Hashemite University.
- Member of the board of trustees of the University of Jordan.
- Member of the board of rights in the University of Jordan.
- Administrative and financial director of the Royal Scientific Society.
- Member of the National Commission for Development Planning.
- Chairman of the Supreme Council for the fight against illiteracy.
- Chairman of the cement company.
- Vice chairman of the phosphate company.
- Vice chairman of the Iraqi Jordanian Land Transport Company.
- Member of the board of management of Bank of Jordan.
- Member of the Council of Arab African International Bank.
- Member of the Council of Arab Company for Investment Management.
- Member of the board of directors of Aqaba Railway.
- Member of the board of Royal Jordanian Management.
- Member of the board of Jordan Investment Corporation management.
- Member of the board of management the authority of the port of Aqaba.
- Member of the board of Jordan Enterprise Manager for the development of economic projects.
- Board member of Emaar Salt Foundation.
- Board member of the Noor Al Hussein Foundation.
- Board member of the Queen Alia Fund Management.
- Chairman of the newspaper Voice of the People.
- Chairman of the board of directors Haya Cultural Center.
- Chairman of the graduates of French universities Club.
- Member of the board graduates of American universities Club.
- Teacher and director in the Ministry of Education.

== Career ==
Ensour was first elected as a deputy to the Jordanian Parliament in 1989, 1992, and finally in 2010. His first ministerial post was as Minister of Planning in 1984. He then became Minister of Planning again in 1985; he also served as Minister of Education (1989); Minister of Foreign Affairs (1991); Minister of Industry and Trade (1993); Minister of Higher Education (1996); Deputy Prime Minister and Minister of Administrative Development (1997); and deputy prime minister and Minister of Information (1998). He also served in the parliament in the lower house of representatives from 1989 to 2001.

Ensour was also governor of Jordan to the World Bank, deputy of Jordan to the International Monetary Fund and deputy permanent delegate to UNESCO; he sits on a number of boards including the Arab African Bank, Nuackchott (President); the University of Jordan (vice-president); and the French Universities' Graduates in Jordan (Honorary President).

In October 2012, he was appointed prime minister by King Abdullah II, replacing Fayez Tarawneh. After general elections in January 2013, King Abdullah reappointed Ensour as prime minister on 9 March 2013. His second cabinet was sworn in on 30 March 2013. His term ended on 29 May 2016.

Ensour is a member of Prague Society for International Cooperation, an NGO whose main goals are networking and developing a new generation of responsible, well-informed leaders and thinkers.

== Personal life ==
Ensour married twice. His first wife, Hala Khleifat, from whom he has three children, died in 2015. Ensour's second marriage was to Ibtissam Hiary, from whom he has 5 children.

== Honours and awards ==
- Supreme Order of the Renaissance, Wissam Al Nahda, Grand Cordon, وسام النهضة عالي الشأن / Jordan
- Order of the Star, Wisam al-Kawkab, Grand Cordon, وسام الكوكب الأردن من الدرجة الأولى / Jordan.
- Order of Independence, Wisam al-Istiqial, Grand Cordon, وسام الإستقلال الأردني من الدرجة الأولى / Jordan
- Education Jordanian Medal – Excellence/ Jordan
- Ordre national de la Légion d'honneur / France
- Order of the Crown, Grand Cross / Belgium
- Medal of the President of the Italian Republic / Italy

== See also ==
- First cabinet of Abdullah Ensour
- Second cabinet of Abdullah Ensour

Political offices
Preceded by Fayez Tarawneh	Prime Minister of Jordan; 2013–2016	Succeeded by Hani Al-Mulki
