= Confessions of a Silencer =

1992 novel by Mu'nis Ar-Razzaz

Confessions of A Silencer (Novel)
- Author: Mu'nis Ar-Razzaz
- Language: Arabic
- Published: 1992
- Publisher: Arab Institute for Research & Publishing
- Pages: 224

Confessions of A Silencer (Iʿtirafātu Katimul Ṣawti) is the 1992 novel by the Jordanian writer Mu'nis Ar-Razzaz, and it was selected among the 100 best Arabic novels.

== The Literary Character ==
In Confessions of A Silencer (Iʿtirafātu Katimul Ṣawti), Ar-Razzaz intentionally creates disorganized dialogues, a common technique in modernist fiction. For example, when the father in the novel speaks, he speaks to himself, so do the mother and young daughter under house arrest, which triggers silence and isolation among the characters.

== Summary ==
The first part of the novel is titled Madarul Ṣada (The Echo Orbit), as echo replaces noise in the absence of dialogue. Then, the climax point is triggered by the daughter as she describes the isolation and silence despite her being among her family under house arrest. The family does not communicate with the outside world unless the son calls once a week. This inconsistent touch with the outside world prefaces the novel's transition from talking about the characters under house arrest to talking about Yousef/The Silencer's confessions.

The father had a high position in the authority that arrested him. In these dialogues, the life threads of these characters become clear as well as the history of the revolutionary father, who brought his party to the authority, who disagreed with him and arrested him. In addition to the mother's history, who fell in love with the father after admiring him and his political ideas.
