= Mujib Dam =

Dam in Madaba, Jordan

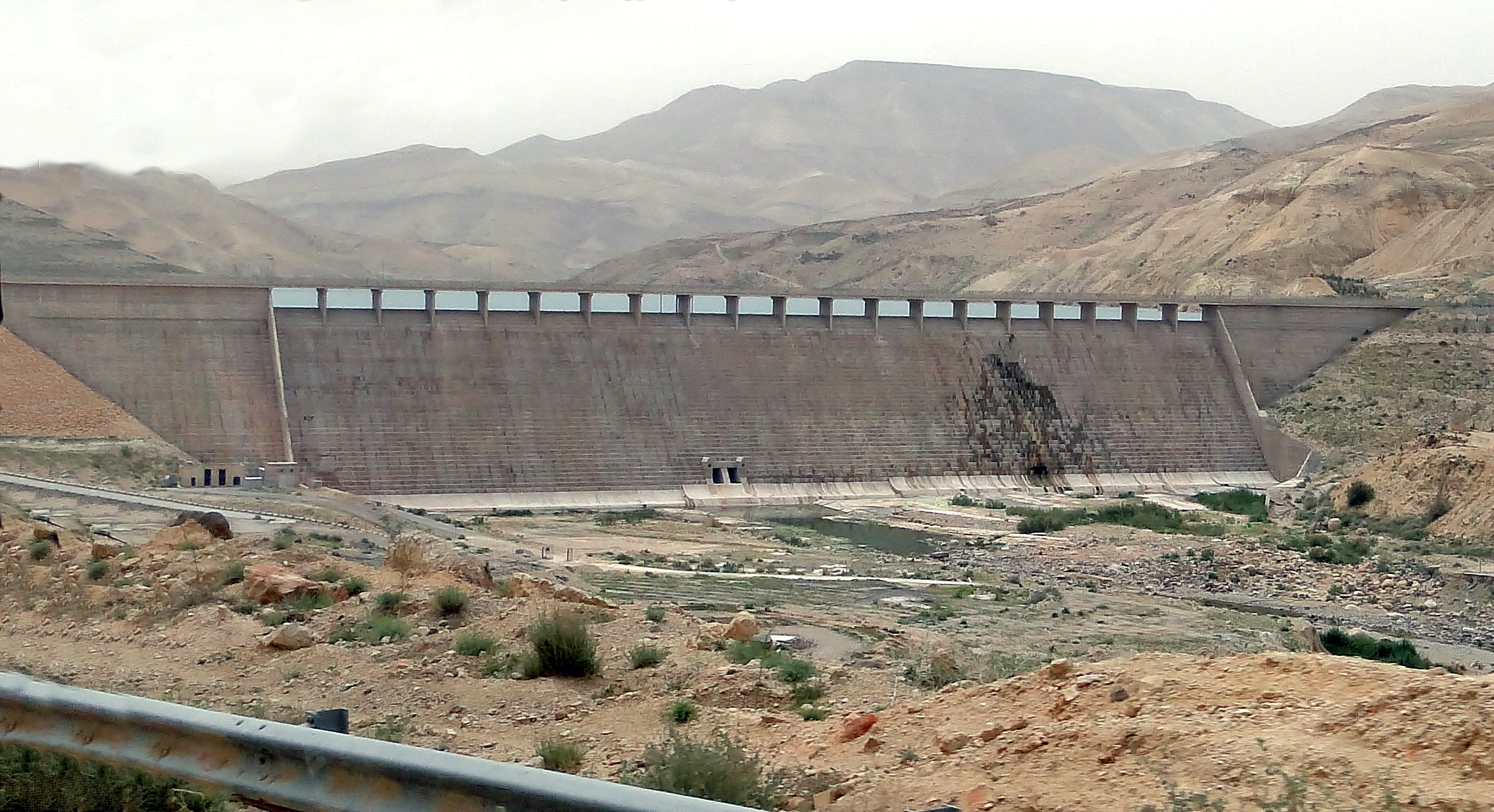
- Dam from west

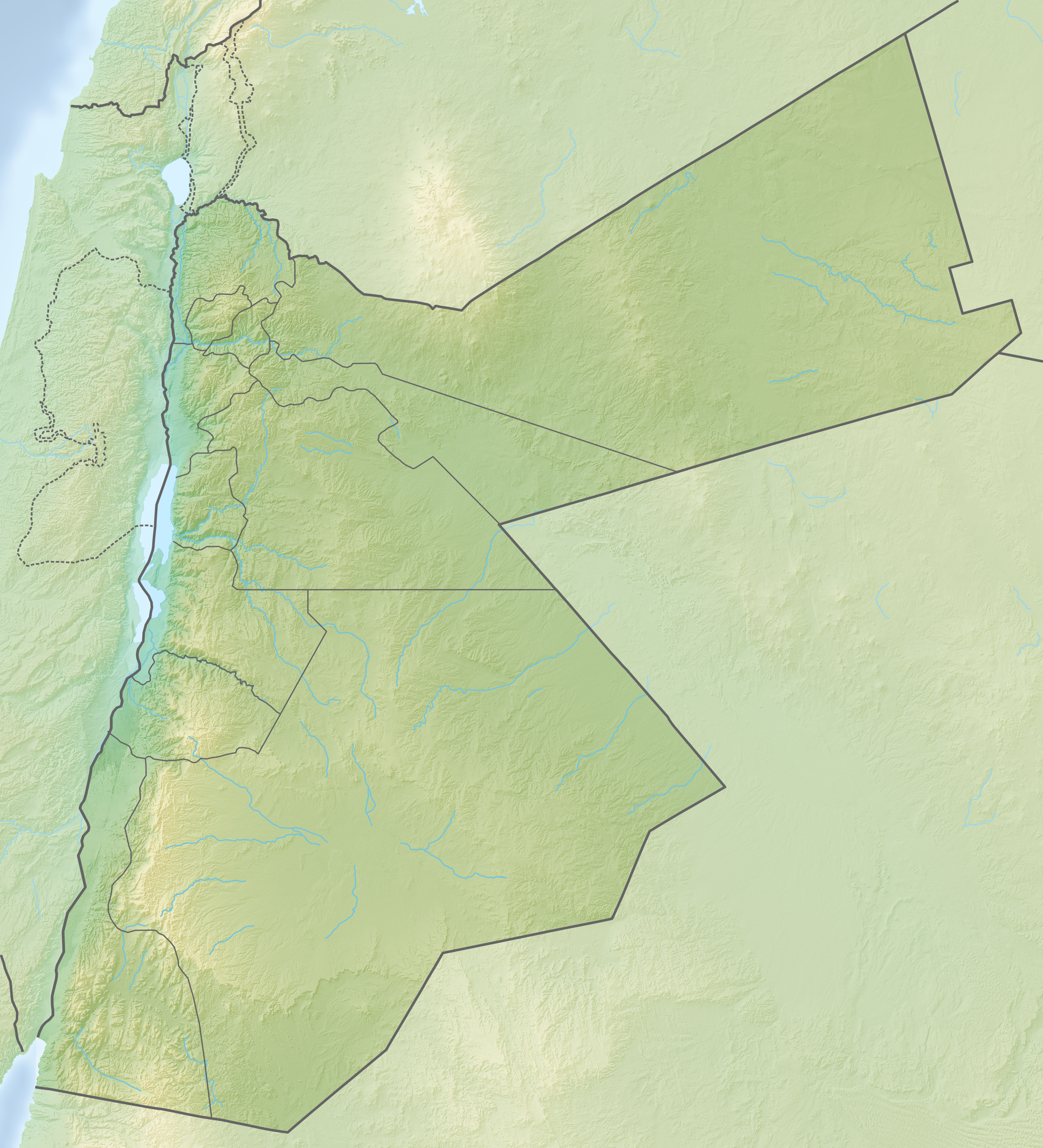
- Location within Jordan
- Official name: سد الموجب
- Country: Jordan
- Location: Wadi Mujib
- Coordinates: 31°26′41″N 35°49′5″E
- Purpose: Irrigation and domestic
- Status: Operational
- Construction began: 1999
- Opening date: 2004
- Construction cost: JD 45 million (US$67 million)
- Owner: Jordan Valley Authority

Dam and spillways
- Type of dam: Rolled concrete/clay-core rockfill
- Height (foundation): 67 metres (220 ft)
- Height (thalweg): 61 metres (200 ft)
- Length: 764 metres (2,507 ft)
- Elevation at crest: 200 metres (660 ft)
- Dam volume: 660,590 cubic metres (864,020 cu yd)
- Spillways: 2
- Spillway type: Free overflow with stepped chute
- Spillway capacity: 530 cubic metres per second (140,000 US gal/s)

Reservoir
- Creates: Mujib Reservoir
- Total capacity: 35 million m^{3} (9.2×10^{9} US gal)
- Catchment area: 4,380 square kilometres (1,690 sq mi)

Mujib Dam (Arabic: سد الموجب) is located in Wadi Mujib, between the cities of Madaba and Kerak, in the Madaba Governorate of Jordan. It is a rolled concrete dam with abutments of clay-core rockfill completed in 2004, after six years of construction. Highway 35, part of the historic King's Highway, crosses the crest. The water it impounds is combined with desalinated water piped from brackish wells along the Dead Sea to the west in a reservoir holding 35 million m^{3} (1 billion US gallons) which primarily supplies Amman, 100 kilometres (62 mi) to the north helping to ease a very stressed national water supply.

== See also ==
- Al-Wehda Dam
- King Talal Dam
