= Water supply and sanitation in Jordan =

Data
- Access to an improved water source: 96% (2012, 2014 estimate)
- Access to improved sanitation: 98% (2012, 2014 estimate)
- Share of collected wastewater treated: 98%
- Continuity of supply: about once per week depending on season and locality (2009); continuous supply only in Aqaba
- Average urban water use (L/person/day): 80
- Average urban water and sanitation tariff (US$/m^{3}): 0.65 (2009, for Amman only, corresponding to a consumption of 20m^{3}/month)
- Share of household metering: 95% (2007 in the Middle Governorates)
- Annual investment in WSS: US$40 per capita per year (2005–2010 average)
- Financing: External grants (27%), external loans (3%), domestic bonds (36%) and government grants (34%) (2005–2010)
- Non-revenue water: 44% (2008)

Institutions
- Decentralization to municipalities: No
- National water and sanitation company: No
- Water and sanitation regulator: Project Management Unit (PMU), only for private operators
- Responsibility for policy setting: Ministry of Water and Irrigation (MWI)
- Sector law: No comprehensive sector law, only the law creating WAJ
- Service providers: 4 (Water Authority of Jordan and three companies: Miyahuna, Aqaba Water Company and Yarmouk Water Company)

Water supply and sanitation in Jordan is characterized by severe water scarcity, which has been exacerbated by an increase in population due to many factors. These include natural population expansion over time as muslim families are often large, regional wars including the Israel War of Independence in 1948, The Six Day War, the Gulf War of 1990, the Iraq War of 2003 and the Syrian Civil War of 2011. Jordan is considered one of the ten most water scarce countries in the world. High population growth, the depletion of groundwater reserves and the impacts of climate change are likely to aggravate the situation in the future.

The country's major surface water resources, the Jordan River and the Yarmouk River, are shared with Israel and Syria. The Disi Water Conveyance Project from the non-renewable Disi aquifer to the Jordanian capital of Amman, opened in July 2013, increases available resources by about 12%. Jordan and Israel signed a peace agreement in 1994. The peace agreement, in Annex II, includes Israel providing 50 million cubic meters of water per year to Jordan. Israel voluntarily doubled that amount to 100 million cubic meters per year. Israel incurs high costs to do this as most of the additional water is produced through desalination of ocean water from the Mediterranian Sea and Red Sea. A plan to bridge the remaining gap between demand and supply through increased use of reclaimed water and desalinated sea water to be provided through the Red Sea-Dead Sea canal was abandoned by Jordan in 2001.

Despite Jordan's severe water scarcity, more than 97% of Jordanians have access to an improved water source and 93% have access to improved sanitation. This is one of the highest rates in the Middle East and North Africa. In Jordan, it is common to store water in rooftop tanks. The level of water lost through leakage, underregistration, and theft in municipal water supply (non-revenue water) is approximately 51%. Water tariffs are subsidized. A National Water Strategy, adopted in 2009, emphasizes desalination and wastewater reuse. The country receives substantial foreign aid for investments in the water sector, accounting for about 30% of water investment financing.

== Modern history and recent developments ==
Map of Jordan showing cities towns mentioned in the article.

The modern history of the Jordanian water sector is characterized by a substantial development of its infrastructure to cope with a large increase of population and by the simultaneous modernization of its institutions to cope with the challenge of developing, operating and maintaining the country's water infrastructure.

=== 1946-1971: The Early Days ===
Shortly after the independence of Jordan from British control in 1946 and its annexation of the West Bank, only a small share of the population of less than half a million had access to piped water on their premises. Drinking water was supplied from local springs; there were no sewers and little irrigation. This early period of independence was characterized by a foiled attempt to develop the water resources share with Syria, the building of limited irrigation infrastructure in the Northern Jordan Valley, and the creation of professional organizations in charge of the water sector.

Between 1953 and 1955 the United States Special Representative for Water in the Middle East, Eric Johnston, had negotiated the Jordan Valley Unified Water Plan to jointly develop the water resources of the Jordan River Basin between Israel, Lebanon, Syria and Jordan. Although the Plan, known as the Johnston Plan, was rejected by the Arab League due to the politics of Israel being involved, Jordan and Israel used it as a basis for some of its future development of water resources. The Plan foresaw the construction of a dam at Maqarin on the Yarmouk River at the Jordanian-Syrian border as well as a diversion weir further downstream to divert the Yarmouk waters for irrigation of the Jordan Valley. Based on a 1953 water sharing treaty with Syria, Jordan made plans and sought funding for the dam from the United States. Israel, which used water from the Yarmouk to replenish the Sea of Galilee to supply the Jordan River, was not consulted. The U.S. decided not to fund the Maqarin dam. Thus, much of the river's winter flows drained to the Jordan River and Dead Sea. This left Jordan needing other sources of water for the irrigation they wanted for the growing population's farming needs. Jordan then embarked on the construction of the East Ghor (King Abdullah) Canal with U.S. funding to develop irrigation in the Northeastern Jordan Valley with the limited water it had available.

For the development of its water infrastructure, Jordan needed to build strong organizations with qualified personnel. For that purpose, two laws were passed in 1959 to create respectively the East Ghor Canal Authority responsible for the development of irrigation infrastructure, and the Central Water Authority responsible for the development of drinking water supply infrastructure. These institutions operated outside of government routine and offered better pay than the regular public service in order to attract the motivated and talented employees required for the important task to develop the country's water sector. These efforts, however, were thwarted when Jordan lost the West Bank (Judea and Sumaria) and with it about a third of its population to Israel, in the Six-Day War of 1967. Additionally, an ensuing period of Palestinian Terrorism led by Yasser Arafat and his Palestine Liberation Organization, known as the Black September lasted until 1971 and prevented governmental implementation of the planned water authorities.

=== 1972-1994: Infrastructure Development, Institution Building and Regional Water Sharing ===
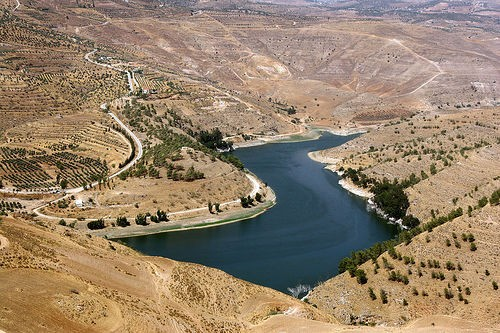
The reservoir of King Talal Dam is the largest reservoir in Jordan, storing freshwater from the Zarqa river and treated wastewater from Amman-Zarqa for irrigation in the Jordan Valley.

From the early 1970s onwards the country's water infrastructure was expanded significantly with the construction of the King Talal Dam completed in 1977 and the completion of the East Ghor Canal (renamed King Abdullah Canal) in 1987. The country's first wastewater treatment plant at Ain Ghazal had been commissioned in 1968, but the construction of other wastewater treatment plants was addressed only beginning in the late 1970s. In 1985, the largest wastewater treatment plant in the country was commissioned in As-Samra, serving Greater Amman. The plant used the stabilization pond technology, a natural technology that needed no electricity.

In terms of institutions, the two autonomous water sector institutions created in the 1959 had been merged into the Natural Resources Authority in 1965, but this overly centralized arrangement including non-water functions such as mining did not prove to be successful. Therefore, in a further institutional shift, in 1973 three new organizations were created, each by its own law: The Amman Water and Sewer Authority (AWSA), the Drinking Water Supply Corporation (DWSC) in charge of water supply in the areas outside the capital, and the Jordan Valley Commission (JVC). In the meantime, Jordan's population had grown to 1.5 million because of natural growth and the influx of Palestinian refugees in 1967. The growing capital ran low on water and its supply became intermittent. In order to overcome the shortage, the Cabinet approved two projects in 1977: The first was the construction of a carrier from Deiralla in the Jordan Valley to pump drinking water to Amman, the second was the construction of a carrier from the Azraq oasis east of the capital. Both projects were completed in the 1980s. At the same time, it was decided to reuse treated wastewater from Amman for irrigation in the Jordan Valley to compensate for the loss of freshwater.

A first National Water Master Plan was developed and finalized in 1977 with the assistance of the German government and its technical assistance agency GTZ.

A separate water balance study was commissioned by the government at the time and was completed by Howard Humphrey and Partners in 1978. This study showed that water resources were greatly insufficient to achieve the country's goals for irrigation development and to provide its growing population with sufficient drinking water. On the basis of this study, Jordan approached the Iraqi government in order to explore the possibility to transfer water from the Euphrates to Jordan. The Iraqi President Saddam Hussein, who was closely allied with Jordan at the time, approved the request, but a feasibility study done in the mid-80s showed that the long-distance transfer would be prohibitively expensive. After abandoning this option, the government shifted its attention to the Disi Water Conveyance Project that would bring fossil groundwater from the border area with Saudi Arabia to Amman.

In terms of institutional development, the government decided to return to the earlier structure of creating two separate autonomous agencies in charge of the water sector. In 1977, it created by law the Jordan Valley Authority (JVA) by merging the JVC and parts of other organizations, charging it with the comprehensive development of the Jordan Valley. In 1983, through another law it created the Water Authority of Jordan (WAJ), responsible for drinking water supply and sanitation in Jordan. The heads of both Authorities had the rank of Minister and reported directly to the Prime Minister, until the Ministry of Water and Irrigation (MWI) was created in 1988 bringing the two agencies under it. Another institutional shift occurred in 1993 when a World Bank water sector review suggested to bring in a private company to run the water and sanitation system of Amman, a move that was endorsed by the government. An important motivation for this step was to increase cost recovery.

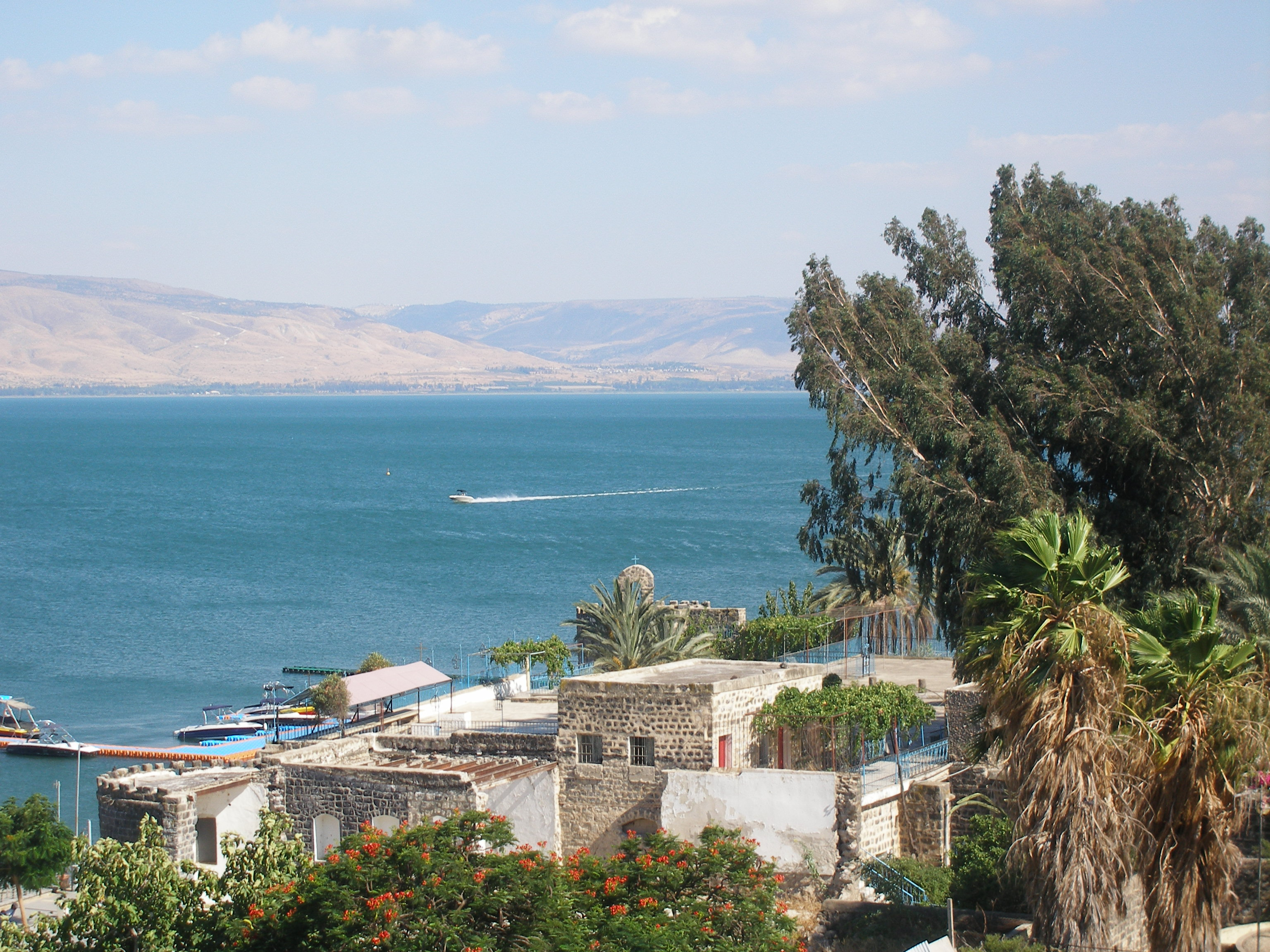
Through the 1994 Peace Treaty with Israel, Jordan gained access to water from the Sea of Galilee.

In 1995, the Water Annex to the 1994 Israel–Jordan peace treaty increased Jordan's available water resources through the delivery of water from the Sea of Galilee and a greater share of water from the Yarmouk River. At the same time it was decided to double the capacity of the Deiralla-Amman conveyor to pump the additional drinking water to Amman. While not mentioned in the Peace Treaty, the idea of a Red Sea-Dead Sea Canal, jointly planned by the two countries in order to raise the declining level of the Dead Sea and to provide more water for Jordan through desalination, gained support as a result of the Peace Treaty. In summer 1998, a drinking water incident occurred in Amman, when water with an unpleasant smell came out of some taps. The incident became a tool in the succession struggle for the throne at a time when King Hussein lay dying. According to history professor Nigel Ashton, then-Water Minister Munther Haddadin was allied with then-Crown Prince Hassan. Hassan's opponents exploited the incident as evidence for “negligence and corruption in high places”, forcing the Water Minister to step down because of his alleged failure to properly oversee the operation of the Zai water treatment plant that treated water brought from the Sea of Galilee and the Jordan Valley to Amman. Along with two other former water ministers, Haddadin was indicted by the State Prosecutor, but the charges were dropped after Crown Prince Hasan was sidelined in favor of King Abdullah II who succeeded his father after his death in February 1999.

=== 1995-today: megaprojects and modernization ===
Jordan pursued other water megaprojects, the US$1 billion Disi Water Conveyance Project inagurated in July 2013. A formal tripartite contract for the US$10 billion Red Sea-Dead Sea Canal project was signed by Israel, Jordan and the Palestinian Authority in 2013/2014. Jordan cancelled the plan in 2021. Jordan also completed other large projects, including the construction of a modern wastewater treatment plant for Amman in As-Samra and the Al-Wehda Dam on the Yarmouk River. Both the Disi Conveyor and the Samra Plant attracted significant private financing for the first time in the history of the Jordanian water sector, despite low levels of cost recovery from water tariffs.

Following the influx of refugees from Kuwait following the latter's occupation by Iraq in 1990 and due to natural growth, Jordan's population had increased to more than 3 million by 1990 and 4.8 million by 2000. This further worsened the already precarious water balance and led to the overloading of the wastewater treatment plant in As-Samra. The plant was unable to produce the required effluent quality, negatively affecting irrigation in the Jordan Valley. It was thus decided to replace the plant with a more modern technology, involving the private sector. In 2003, a 25-year Build-Operate-Transfer (BOT) contract was signed with a consortium including the French company Suez Environnement. The plant was commissioned in 2006, providing water of a considerably improved quality for irrigation. In terms of cooperation with Syria, in 1987 the two governments had signed a new water-sharing treaty that was more favorable to Syria compared to the 1953 treaty, acknowledging the increased water use for irrigation in the upper basin inside Syria. After much delay, it was decided in 2001 to reduce the size of the dam on the Yarmouk River compared to the originally planned Maqarin Dam. The dam, called Al-Wehda Dam (Unity Dam), was commissioned in 2011, but yielded much less water than anticipated due to Syrian use upstream.

A digital National Water Master Plan was launched in 2004, replacing the first Master Plan. It was an integrated plan intended to enable decision makers to set policies and strategies based on planning scenarios derived from water consumption trends in various locations and sectors such as agriculture, municipal use and industry. The Master Plan was connected to a Water Information System (WIS) which was to contain all monitoring data related to demands and resources.

Concerning the institutional reform and modernization of the water sector, the management contract for Amman was awarded in 1999 to the French company Lyonnaise des Eaux. It brought about many improvements, although it fell short of contractual targets. In 2007 it ended and a subsidiary of WAJ in the form of a public company, Miyahuna (“Our Water”), was created. In 2004, a first commercially oriented public water company had been created as a subsidiary of WAJ in the Southern town of Aqaba, called the Aqaba Water Company (AWC). A third water company, the Yarmouk Water Company (YWC), was created in Northern Jordan in 2011. In 2013 Miyahuna was given the responsibility for water supply and sanitation in Madaba Governorate and in January 2014 in Zarqa Governorate under public-public management contracts, while the employees in these two governorates remain employees of WAJ.

In May 2009, King Abdullah gave the go-ahead for a new National Water Strategy until 2022, replacing an earlier Water Strategy from 1998. The strategy included investments of Jordanian Dinar 5.86 billion (US$8.24 billion) over a period of 15 years, corresponding to more than 160% of Jordan's GDP. It also foresaw a decreasing reliance on groundwater from 32% in 2007 to 17%, increased use of treated wastewater in agriculture from 10% to 13% and increased use of desalination from 1% to 31%. According to then-Minister of Water, Raed Abu Soud, even after the completion of the Disi Water Conveyance Project, the water deficit in 2022 would be about 500 million cubic metres, highlighting the need to include desalination under the Red Sea-Dead Sea canal in the strategy. The strategy also envisaged institutional reforms such as enacting a new water law, separating operational from administrative functions, as well as production from distribution operations, creating a Water Council with advisory functions and establishing a Water Regulatory Commission. While the legal and institutional reforms were not implemented, the Disi Water Conveyance Project was completed in 2013 by the Turkish firm Gama. The influx of about one million refugees from Syria since 2012 increased the population of Jordan to more than nine million. It also increased water demand substantially. For lack of financing, the Red Sea-Dead Sea Canal is not being pursued any more in its original form for the time being. Instead, a scaled-down, more realistic version is being pursued. This project involves a water swap between Jordan and Israel, with Jordan supplying desalinated water from Aqaba to Southern Israel, while Israel provides additional water from the Sea of Galilee to Northern Jordan. Brine water from the desalination plant is to be supplied to the Dead Sea. In 2015, the bidding for the desalination plant at Aqaba was commenced, and the plant was inaugurated in 2017 by the then-Prime minister Hani Mulki. The clean water it will generate, estimated at 5 million cubic metres annually, will be used for drinking purposes, agricultural and industrial needs

By the end of 2028, a new flagship project is projected to be a longer-term solution to Jordan's water crisis. The Aqaba-Amman Water Desalination and Conveyance Project will collect water from the Red Sea in the Gulf of Aqaba in the south, desalinate it, and route it 450 kilometers north to Amman and its surrounding area, delivering 300 million cubic meters of water each year.

In May 2025, the Water Authority of Jordan stated that with the aid of the Spanish Agency for International Development Cooperation (AECID), it will conduct a JD 1.214 million rehabilitation project, Al-Lajoun Wells. The wells that are located in Karak Governorate, are integral to the country's water infrastructure, supplying essential water resources to Amman and surrounding regions. These wells tap into the B2/A7 and Ram Group aquifers, with a combined capacity of approximately 16 million cubic meters annually. Over the past decade, increased groundwater extraction, particularly from the Ram Group aquifer, has led to notable declines in water levels, ranging from 0.08 to 1.8 meters per year in various wells. the rehabilitation project will address these challenges and enhance water efficiency.

In July 2025 Jordan and Syria have agreed to fairly share water from the Yarmouk River after talks at the Wihdeh Dam. They signed a deal to monitor water use together and fix problems like illegal wells. Jordan plans to try cloud seeding to increase rainfall, and Syria offered to give Jordan extra water this summer. Both sides called the talks positive and a step toward better regional cooperation.

== Access ==
Jordan has reached a high level of providing water supply and sanitation services (see table). 99.3% of the population have access to improved water supply, 99.5% to improved sanitation, which is high compared to other developing countries and considering Jordan's very scarce resources. Although the physical infrastructure exists, a lack of available water causes a rising demand of bottled and tanked water for many households.

Access to Water and Sanitation in Jordan (2016)
		Urban (90.7% of the population)	Rural (9.3% of the population)	Total
Water	Improved water source	99.5%	99.5%	99.3%
Water	House connections	62%	54.7%	61.1%
Sanitation	Improved sanitation	99.7%	97.8%	99.5%
Sanitation	Sewerage	70.8%	22.7%	64.3%

According to WAJ, only 65% of the population are connected to the sewerage system. The rest of those having access to improved sanitation uses on-site sanitation solutions such as septic tanks. These septic tanks, if not lined properly, may leak to the groundwater aquifers and contaminate them.

== Service quality ==
=== Continuity of supply ===
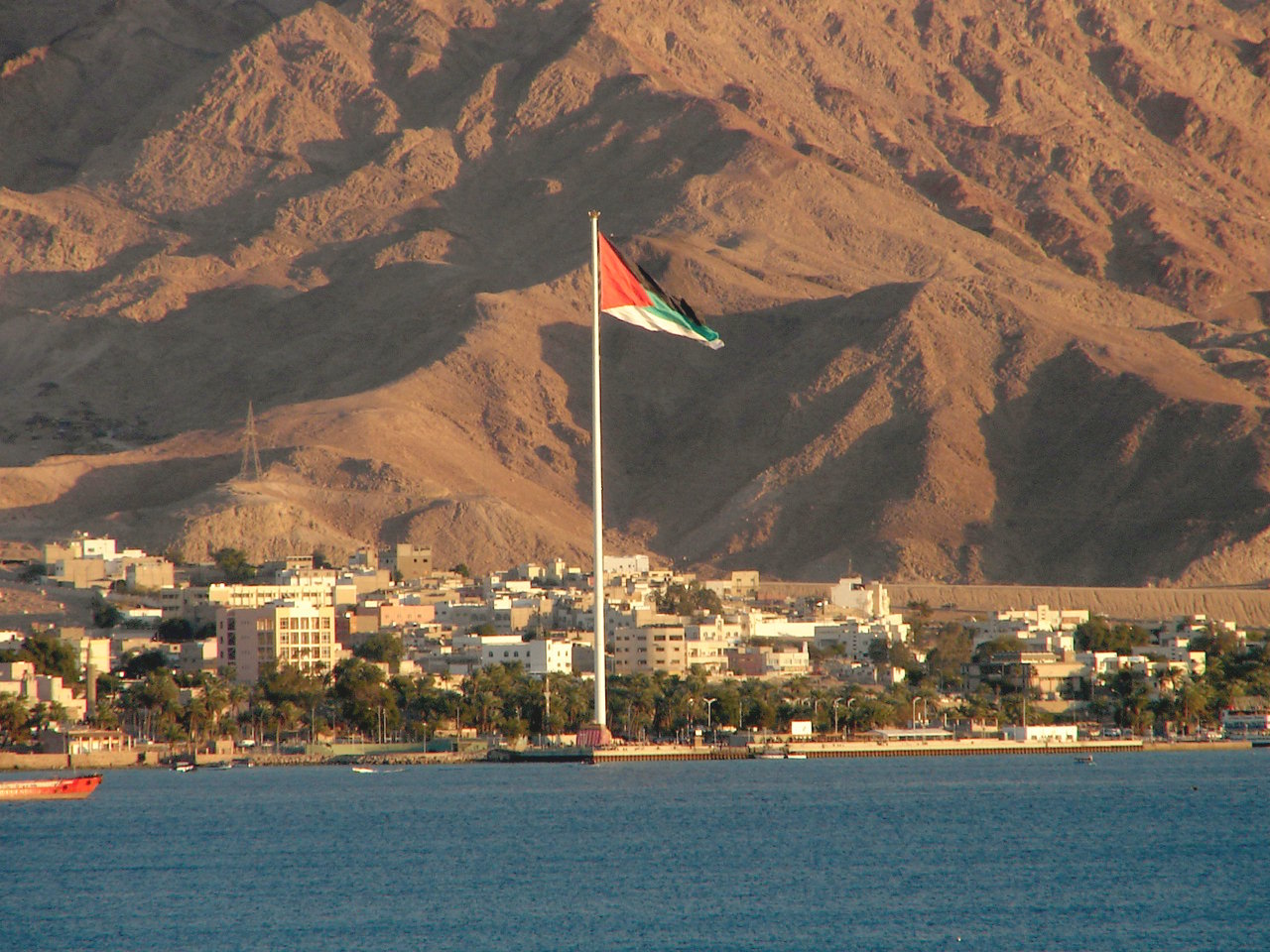
Aqaba, the only city in Jordan that enjoys continuous drinking water supply, receives its water by gravity from the fossil Disi aquifer.

Water supply in the Jordanian highlands, where most of the population lives, is generally intermittent. According to a 2008 study by the University of Michigan, water is delivered once a week in big cities like Amman and once every twelve days in some rural areas. According to a 2007 survey the mean rate of supply per week was 1.5 days in Madaba governorate, 2.9 days in Balqa governorate and 3.2 days in Zarqa governorate. In Amman, according to the water distribution plan of Miyahuna, 8 out of 44 main distribution zones received continuous water supply "except in emergency cases" in 2012. Most other distribution zones were scheduled to receive water for either once a week for 24 hours or twice a week for a total of 36–48 hours. To what extent actual supply follows the distribution program, especially during summer, is not clear. Since the Disi-Amman Conveyor became operational in summer 2013 the continuity of supply in Amman has increased.

Wadi Musa and the neighboring villages of Taiba, B'Doul and Beida were among the few localities in the Highlands that briefly enjoyed continuous water supply after a new well field had been built and the distribution network had been rehabilitated in 2001. However, only a few years later, water supply became intermittent again. Aqaba has always enjoyed continuous water supply thanks to abundant gravity-fed water supply from the fossil Disi aquifer in the Highlands above the coastal city.

=== Drinking water quality ===
Drinking water quality in Jordan is governed by the Jordan Institution for Standards & Metrology's Standard 286 of 2008, which is based on the World Health Organization drinking water guidelines. Jordan's standards were modified in 2001 and later in 2008, after a major drinking water pollution outbreak occurred in Amman in the summer of 1998 due to a malfunction of the capital's main drinking water treatment plant. The 2001 changes introduced stricter quality controls to prevent future pollution in drinking water. A 2005 study of different potable water sources in four governorates showed that drinking water quality was in compliance with national physiochemical standards. For the purpose of monitoring groundwater quality, a network of observation wells is installed in each of the “groundwater basins”. At the household level water is stored in water tanks (usually on top of the buildings) to be used until municipal water is delivered. In a 2011 study by the Jordanian Government, more than 90% of samples taken at house water storage tanks in three Amman distribution zones (Rasheed, Kharabsheh and Khalda) had chlorine residual levels between 0.2 mg/L and 0.5 mg/L. These values are in compliance with the recommendations of the WHO Drinking Water Guidelines. According to the WHO, the water can thus be classified as "safe to drink". Despite these results, a 2012 Jordan Times article reported that “[a] customer satisfaction survey carried out by the Jordan Water Company (Miyahuna) showed that customers avoid drinking tap water, fearing it is contaminated”.

=== Wastewater treatment ===
Jordan's first wastewater treatment plant was established in 1968 in Ain Ghazal near Amman (the plant now serves as a pre-treatment plant for the As-Samra plant). The construction of other treatment plants started in the early 1980s. The total number of treatment plants was 28 as of 2013, treating about 324,000 m^{3} per day (118 million m^{3}/year), or about 98% of the collected wastewater. By far the largest treatment plant is the As-Samra plant that treats the wastewater of Amman-Zarqa, accounting for about 80% of all wastewater treated. The plant initially used the stabilization pond technology, but was rebuilt using the activated sludge technology in 2008 under a Build-Operate-Transfer contract signed in 2002. In June 2012 the government signed a contract for the expansion of the treatment plant to a capacity of 365,000 m^{3}. Water is reused mainly for irrigation in the Jordan Valley, with some reuse for irrigation in the Highlands and limited industrial reuse in Aqaba.

Wastewater treatment plants in Jordan (Source: WAJ)
No.	Treatment plant name	Year of commissioning	Year of upgrading	Treatment technology	Design flow (m^{3}/day)	Actual average flow (m^{3}/day) 2010	Operator	Reuse	Biogas digestion
1	Aqaba Natural	1987		Stabilisation ponds	9,000	6,371	AWC	Local	No
2	Aqaba Mechanical	2005		Extended aeration	12,000	9,846	AWC	Local	
3	Al Baqa	1987		Trickling filter	14,900	10,209	WAJ	Local	
4	Fuheis	1997		Activated sludge	2,400	2,221	WAJ		
5	Irbid Central (Fo'ara)	1987	2014 (planned)	Trickling filter & activated sludge	11,023	8,132	YWC	Jordan Valley (planned)	
6	Jerash (East)	1983		Oxidation ditch	3,250	3,681	YWC		
7	Al Karak	2013			7,060	?	WAJ	Local	
8	Kufranja	1989	2014 (planned)	Trickling filter	1,900 (18,000 after expansion)	2,763	YWC	Local	
9	Madaba	1989		Activated sludge	7,600	5,172	WAJ	Local	
10	Mafraq	2013		Activated sludge	6,550	2,009	YWC	Local	No
11	Ma'an	1989		Extended aeration	5,772	3,171	WAJ	Local	
12	Abu Nuseir	1986		Activated sludge R, B, C	4,000	2,571	WAJ		
13	Ramtha	1987		Activated sludge	7,400	3,488	YWC	Local	
14	As Salt	1981		Extended aeration	7,700	5,291	WAJ	Local	
15	Tafila	1988		Trickling filter	1,600	1,380	WAJ	Local	
16	Wadi Al Arab (Doughara)	1999	2014 (planned)	Extended aeration	21,000	10,264	YWC	Jordan Valley (planned)	
17	Wadi Hassan	2001		Oxidation ditch	1,600	1,132	YWC	Local	
18	Wadi Musa	2000		Extended aeration	3,400	3,029	WAJ	Local	
19	Wadi as Sir	1997		Aerated lagoon	4,000	3,624	Miyahuna	Local	
20	Al Ekeder	2005		Stabilisation ponds	4,000	over 4,000	YWC	Plant overloaded	No
21	Al Lijoon	2005		Stabilisation ponds	1,000	853	YWC		No
22	Tall Almanta	2005		Trickling filter & activated sludge	400	300			
23	Al Jiza	2008		Activated sludge	4,000	704			
24	As Samra	1984	2004	Activated sludge	267,000	230,606	Suez-Morganti	Local and in Jordan Valley	Yes
25	Al Merad (Sakib)	2010		Activated sludge	10,000	1,000	YWC	Local	
26	Shobak	2010		Stabilisation ponds	350	100	WAJ		No
27	Al Mansorah	2010		Stabilisation ponds	50	15			No
28	Wadi Shalala	2013		Activated sludge	13,700		YWC	Jordan Valley (planned)	Yes
29	South Amman	2014 (planned)		Activated sludge	(52,000)		Miyahuna	planned	
Total					428,690	323,951			

=== Accessibility of information ===
The 2015 Report of the UN Special Rapporteur on the human right to safe drinking water and sanitation encouraged the Ministry of Water and Irrigation and Water Authorities to make more information accessible by creating a system of public information through various media channels, including online. These should include information relating to water and sanitation, such as the results of water sampling. Thus strengthening the human right of access to information. According to the report these measures are also crucial for gaining public confidence in water quality, the reliability of services and encourage people to accept tariff reform.

== Water use and environmental awareness ==
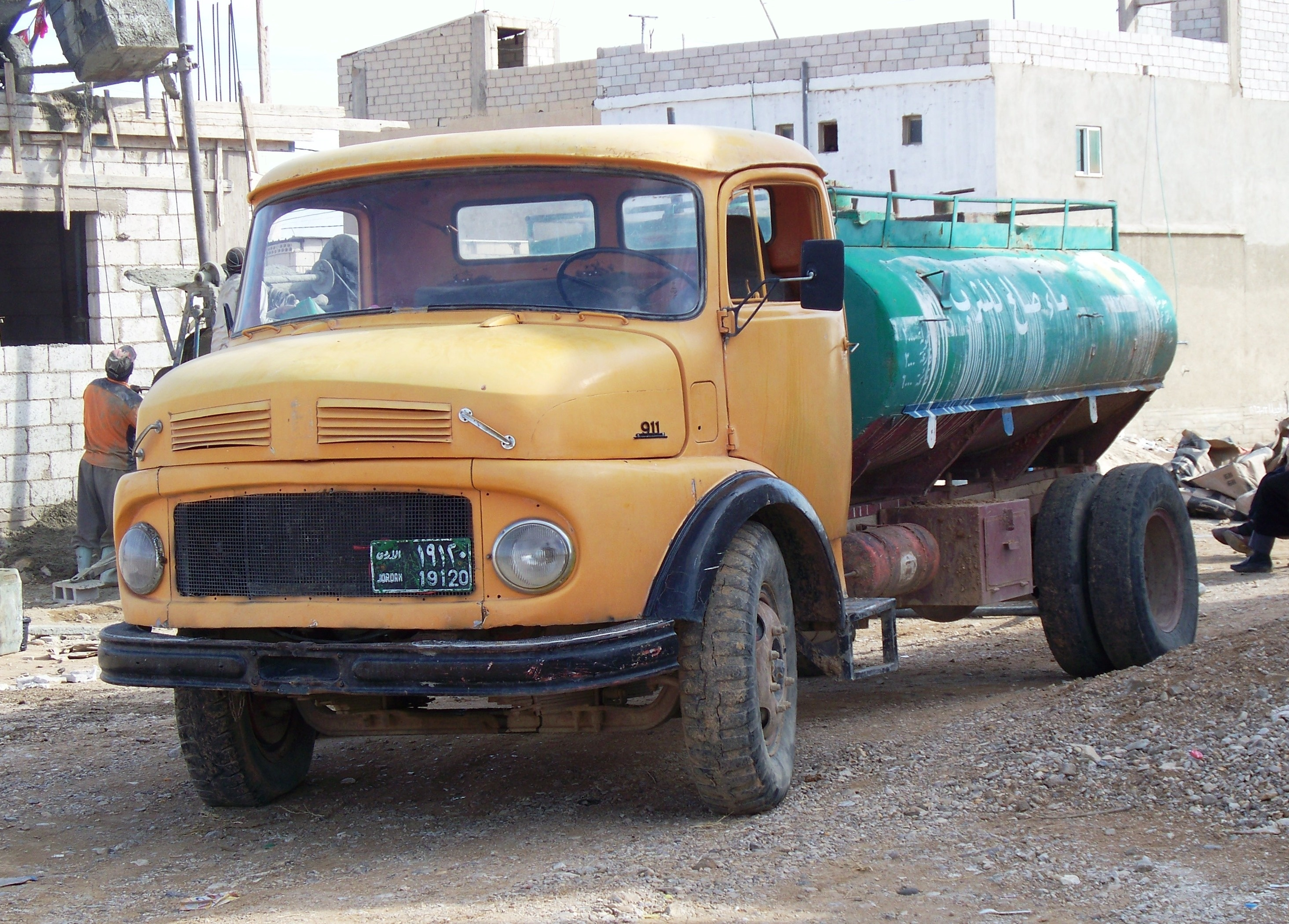
Water trucks are an important source of drinking water for many Jordanians.

Given the high water scarcity in Jordan, the average per capita use is lower than in most other countries. Water production before network losses is about 120 liters per person a day while actual consumption is close to 80 liters per capita a day. A survey of water consumption habits by households in Eastern Amman and in 14 villages in the Northern Governorates showed that total consumption per capita lies between 60 and 80 liters per day. About 20-30% of this water is obtained from sources other than the public piped system, including from bottled water, water bought from tankers, rainwater harvesting and springs. In rural areas, 28% of households surveyed harvested rainwater and stored it in cisterns for drinking, since they considered it to be of better quality than piped water. In Eastern Amman, 12% of households bought water in large bottles and 30% bought water from private tankers. Most households have roof storage tanks with a volume of 1–2 m^{3}. According to the 2009 Population and Family Health Survey, 31% of households use bottled water, 7% use rainwater, 2% tanker water and 60% tap water as their primary source of drinking water. According to the same survey, 22% of households filter tap water and the majority does not apply any type of treatment. A 2007–08 survey by the German-Jordanian water programme in the middle governorates Zarqa, Balqa and Madaba showed that 79% of households use tap water as their main source of drinking water and that 37% of households treat water before drinking it. Treated water bought in 5-gallon canisters and private water vendors that supply water in trucks are the main source of drinking water for 15% of households.

The government as well as different NGOs have been making efforts to increase public awareness of water scarcity and to encourage water conservation. One example is the Water Wise Women Initiative carried out since 2007 in initially five local communities throughout Jordan. The initiative builds on the efforts of volunteers organized in 50 community development centers by supported by the Jordanian Hashemite Fund for Human Development (JOHUD). It trains female volunteers called "change pioneers" in topics such as water saving, rainwater harvesting, water storage, plumbing, hygiene and water use for house gardening. It thus provides opportunities for women to generate income and to reduce expenses for bottled water, water bought from trucks and hired plumbers. In addition, the initiative reaches out to school girls and children, e.g. via a cartoon addressing water issues.

=== Illegal water use ===
In 2015, research found that tanker delivered water sales in Jordan were over 10 times higher than what was officially authorized, this means that about 91% of this water came from illegal extractions from wells.

In August 2025 The Ministry of Water and Irrigation, in cooperation with security forces, performed operations in Khan Al-Zabeeb and Wadi Al-Seer to fight illegal water use. Several unauthorized wells in Wadi Al-Seer were sealed, pumps confiscated, and a drilling rig seized in Khan Al-Zabeeb. Authorities confirmed that legal action is underway and emphasized public cooperation, warning that tampering with water sources carries severe penalties.

== Water balance ==
Jordan is considered one of the four most water scarce countries in the World. The limited water resources are exposed to pollution. Population growth is expected to increase the pressure on available water resources.

The National Water Strategy defines “water deficit” as “water demand” minus “water resources”. “Water demand” is not used in an economic sense where demand depends on price. Instead demand is defined as water needs derived from policy objectives. Thus the figure given in the strategy for water demand in agriculture - 1,080 million m^{3} (MCM)/year - is far greater than actual water use of about 600 MCM/year. In 2007, agriculture accounted for 72% of “water demand”, while the municipal share was 24% and the shares of tourism and industries were 3% and 1%, respectively. The water deficit of 565 million m^{3} (MCM)/year for 2007 thus is mainly caused by assumptions about “water needs” in agriculture.

The Strategy projects that municipal and industrial water needs will increase by 276 MCM/year from 2007 to 2022 (+ 29%), while agricultural water needs will stagnate. The Strategy envisages increasing water supply through three measures:

- more use of reclaimed water in agriculture and industry (+ 156 MCM/year),
- a net increase of fossil groundwater use (+ 59 MCM /year) through the Disi Water Conveyance Project completed in 2013, and
- the desalination of seawater as part of the Red Sea-Dead Sea Canal (+ 500 MCM/year) was to be completed in 2022, but was abandoned in 2021.

These measures could have provided more water than what is needed to cover the projected increase in municipal and industrial water demand were it not for their abandonment due to cost. The remaining amount could have been used to cover “water needs” in agriculture, to reduce groundwater overuse or to restore freshwater aquatic ecosystems.

=== Water resources ===
Jordan's water resources include conventional as well as non-conventional resources, the latter e.g. comprising water reuse and desalination.

==== Conventional Water Resources ====
Conventional water resources in Jordan consist of groundwater and surface water. Countrywide, twelve groundwater basins have been identified. In terms of sustainability, their state can be described as critical since some of them are exploited to their maximum capacity, while others are overexploited, threatening their future use. The long term safe yield of renewable groundwater has been estimated at 275 million cubic metres/year. The major surface water sources are the Jordan River, the Yarmouk River and the Zarqa River.

The Jordan River is used for water primarily by Israel, the Palestinian Authority and Jordan. Syria influences the water in the river, as it takes water from the Yarmouk River that feeds the Jordan River. As such, Jordan cannot get the water it needs from the Jordan alone. Syria and Jordan signed a bilateral treaty over the sharing of the Yarmouk River in 1987 in preparation for the construction of the Al-Wehda Dam on the border between the two countries. Annex II of the Israel–Jordan Treaty of Peace of 1994 specifies the allocation of the Jordan River and the lower Yarmouk River water between the two countries. As part of this treaty, Israel supplies Jordan with 20 million cubic metres per year during the summer from the Sea of Galilee in exchange for the same amount that Israel pumps from the Yarmouk River in the winter for storage in the Sea of Galilee. The treaty also specifies the supply of 10 million m^{3} of water from Israel to Jordan and the supply of an additional 50 million cubic metres per year of drinkable water for Jordan. A report from 2025 by Secretary-General of the Jordan Valley Authority, Eng. Hisham Al-Hayasa claims that there is a loss of up to 27% of the total waterflow in the Jordan valley, much of it from illegal use of water within Jordan.

The Zarqa River is severely polluted by industry, municipal wastewater and non-point sources. The King Talal Dam, Jordan's largest surface water reservoir, faces low water levels and pollution. However, water quality in the King Talal reservoir has improved as a result of the construction of the new As-Samra wastewater treatment plant. The National Water Strategy estimates total renewable freshwater resources at 575 million cubic metres/year plus 90 million cubic metres/year of treated wastewater, totaling 665 million cubic metres/year.

==== Water reuse ====
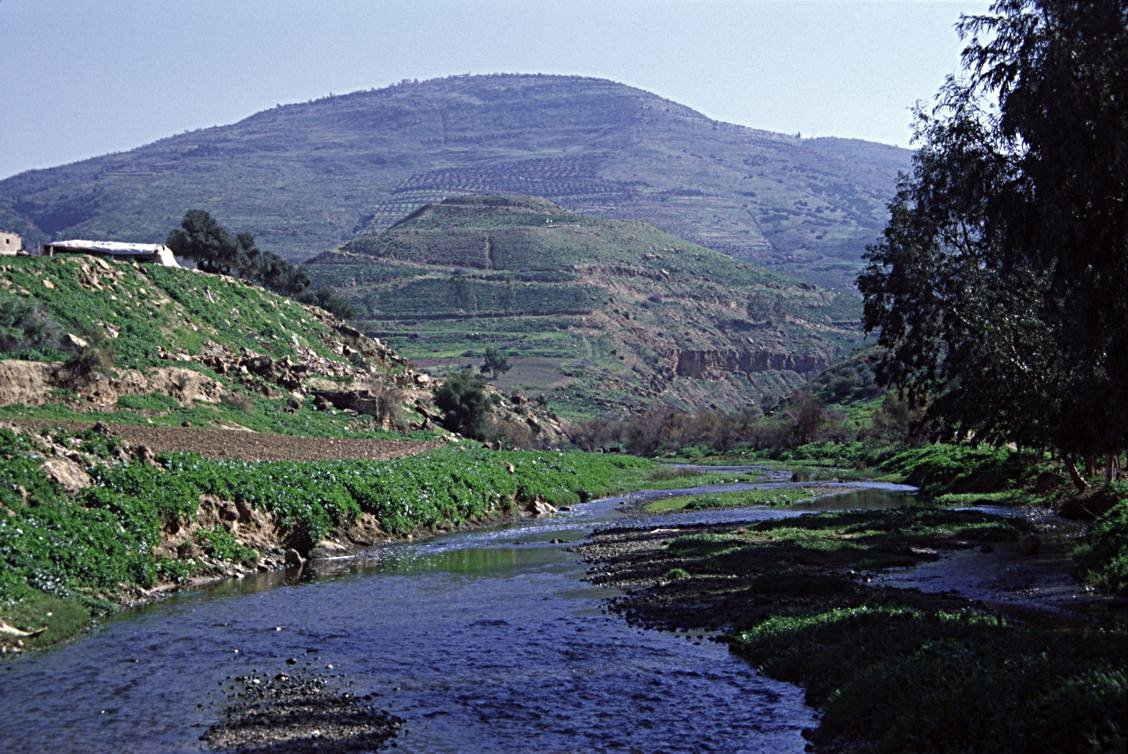
Treated wastewater from the Amman-Zarqa area flows through the Zarqa River to the Jordan Valley where it is reused indirectly for irrigation.

Water reuse is an increasingly important element in Jordan's water balance. Reuse of treated wastewater ( also called "reclaimed water") occurs both indirectly, after discharge of the effluent to a river and mixing with freshwater, and directly, e.g. without mixing with freshwater.

Strategies and challenges. The increased use of reclaimed water is part of Jordan's national water strategy. As part of it, a strategy for pricing and marketing reclaimed water has been established. Extension workers from the Ministry of Agriculture use a computer-based information system to advise farmers on how to optimize their fertigation in light of the irrigation water quality, location, crop, soil type and other factors. Despite these efforts, the majority of farmers in the Jordan Valley are not aware of the nutrient content of the reclaimed water, although experience from demonstration sites shows that using it, fertiliser expenditures can be reduced by 60%. One challenge for the reuse of wastewater is the fact that industries discharge untreated wastewater into the sewer system. However, this industrial wastewater contains heavy metals and other substances which the municipal wastewater treatment plants cannot remove.

Standards. The Jordanian standard JS893:2006 restricts the direct re-use of treated domestic wastewater to crops that are not eaten raw. It sets different standards for various reuse categories such as cooked vegetables, parks & landscaping/roads in towns (Class A), fruit trees, sides of roads and green areas (Class B) and fodder & industrial crop & forest trees (Class C). Industrial Wastewater Standard Specification No 202/2007 complements the above standards, also distinguishing between different reuse categories.

Furthermore, a Reuse Coordination Committee has been established. A crop monitoring program confirmed that use of treated wastewater in Jordan meets the health-based target recommended by the WHO guidelines for the safe use of treated wastewater.

Indirect reuse of reclaimed water from Greater Amman. The reclaimed water (treated wastewater) from the largest wastewater treatment plant in Jordan, As-Samra, flows through the Zarqa River into the King-Talal-Reservoir where it mixes with freshwater. From there it flows into the King-Abdullah-Canal in the Jordan Valley where it further mixes with freshwater. The diluted reclaimed water is reused on about 4,000 farms covering 10,000 hectares in the Southern part of the valley, mostly using drip irrigation.

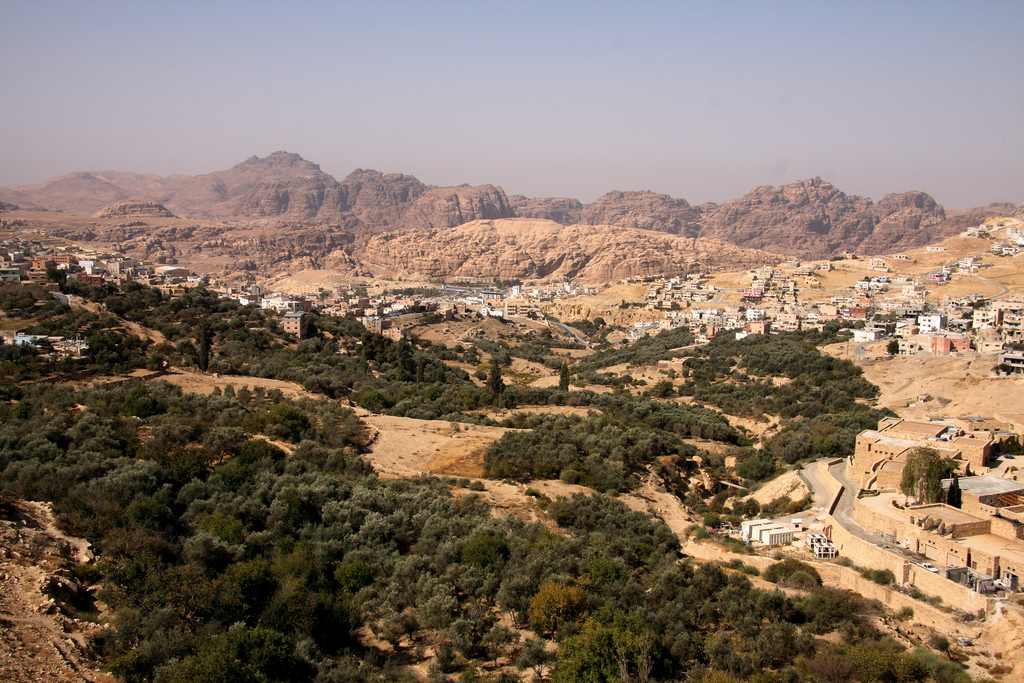
Wadi Musa where the first pilot project for direct reuse of treated wastewater in agriculture in Jordan was implemented.

Direct reuse projects. According to one estimate, 1,500 ha were irrigated with reclaimed water in the vicinity of treatment plants as of 2009 in 15 locations, of which the biggest are near As-Samra (510 ha), Aqaba (208 ha), Ramtha (121 ha) and Wadi Musa (107 ha). Crops irrigated are forage crops and tree crops. One of the first pilot projects for direct reuse was implemented in Wadi Musa with support from USAID. Water was first used to irrigate a demonstration farm, and then the fields of nearby farmers. Another pilot project was initiated using wastewater from the small Wadi Hassan treatment plant to irrigate green spaces on the campus of the University of Irbid, and commercial fruit plantations. In most cases of direct reuse, the Water Authority of Jordan, the operator of most municipal wastewater treatment plants in Jordan, has concluded contracts with farmers. The total area irrigated under contracts with WAJ is 760 ha, or about half the total irrigated area. It is thus about 12 times smaller than the area irrigated with indirectly reclaimed water from the As-Samra plant in the Jordan Valley.

Reuse of reclaimed water from Greater Irbid in the Jordan Valley. Reclaimed water from three wastewater treatment plants in the area of Irbid in the North of Jordan - Wadi Shallala, Central Irbid and Wadi Al-Arab - is channeled through a chain of connected pipelines to the Northern Jordan Valley where it is blended with freshwater for use in irrigation. While farmers were initially reluctant to use the reclaimed water, leading to some of the reclaimed water being discharged into the Jordan River, the use of reclaimed water has increased. The construction of two hydropower plants was begun in 2024 to generate electricity using the elevation differential of more than 1,000m.

==== Desalination ====
Desalination, which includes both desalination of sea water and desalination of brackish water, is another important non-conventional water resource for Jordan. The key project for sea water desalination was the Red Sea-Dead Sea Canal project which was abandoned. The most important plant for desalination of brackish water is the Ma'in-Mujib system which supplies water to Amman.

=== Impact of climate change on the water balance ===
In 2009 a government report noted that "Jordan’s remarkable development achievements are under threat due to the crippling water scarcity, which is expected to be aggravated by climate change." Rainfall is expected to decline significantly and evaporation and transpiration of plants will increase due to increased temperatures.

== Infrastructure ==
Jordan's water resources are located far away from its population centers, in particular the Greater Amman area where about half the country's population lives and which lies at about 1,000 meter above sea level. To address this challenge, Jordan has developed an extensive water supply infrastructure to provide water for both irrigation and municipal uses.

=== Existing infrastructure ===
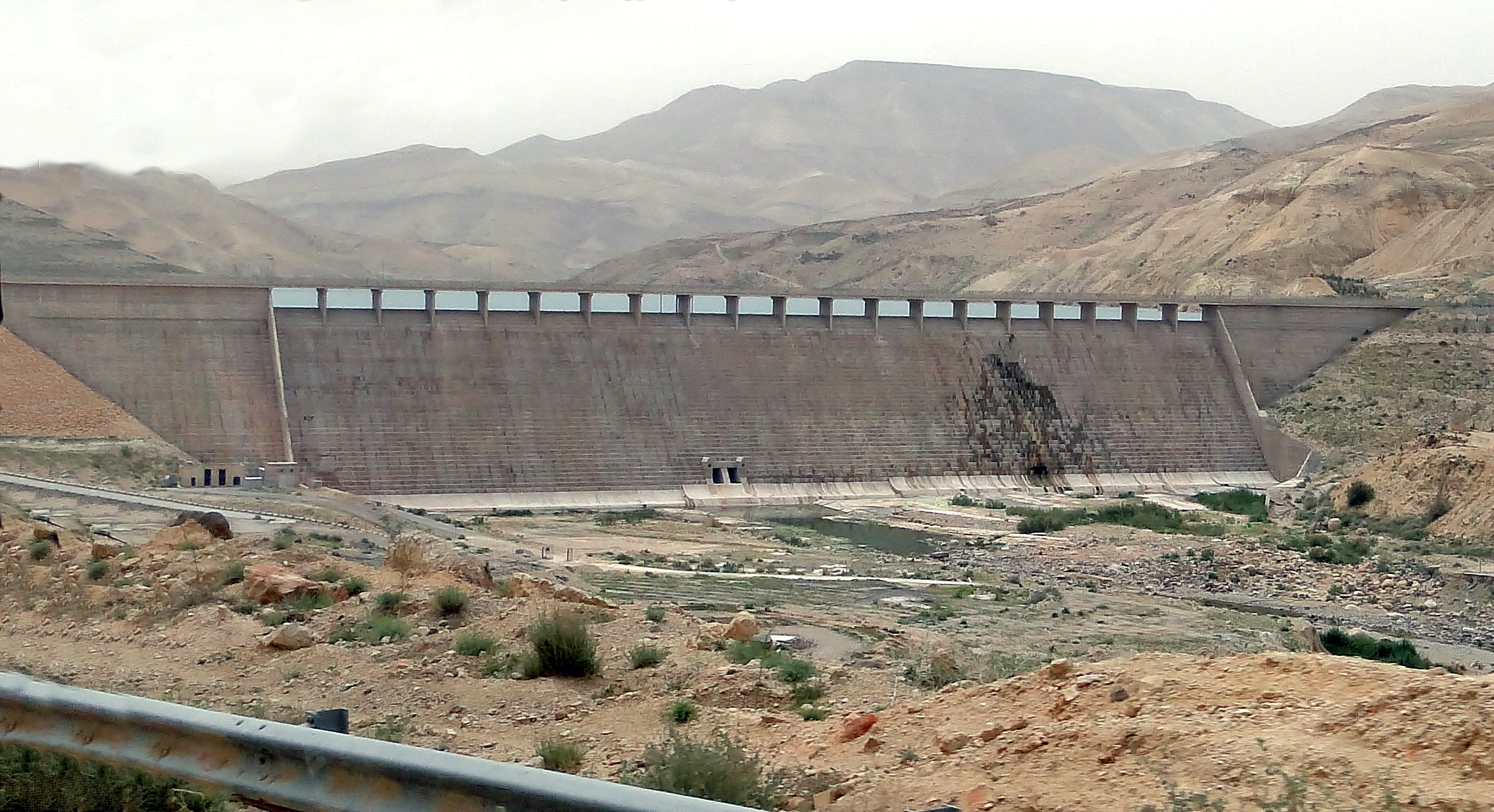
The Mujib dam stores water from Wadi Mujib which is then mixed with desalinated water from brackish springs near the shore of the Dead Sea and then pumped up to Amman for drinking water supply.

The key elements of Jordan's overall water infrastructure are

- the Al-Wehda Dam on the Yarmouk River;
- the King Abdullah Canal (KAC) in the Jordan Valley which is fed primarily by the Yarmouk River, the Mukhaibah springs near the Yarmouk River and a number of wadis draining into the Jordan Valley;
- the As-Samra wastewater treatment plant that treats most of Greater Amman's wastewater and discharges it to the Zarqa River; and
- the King Talal Dam on the Zarqa River from where the water returns to the KAC downstream of Deir Alla for irrigation in the Lower Jordan Valley;

The following systems provide drinking water for the Amman-Zarqa metropolitan area:

- The Disi Water Conveyance Project that extracts 100 million m^{3} (2.6×10^{10} US gal) of water a year from the fossil Disi aquifer 325 kilometres (202 mi) south of Amman.
- the Deir Alla-Amman system pumps up to 90 million m^{3} (2.4×10^{10} US gal) a year water from the KAC to Amman over a height of 1,200 metres (3,900 ft) and treats it in the Zai water treatment plant;
- the Ma'in-Mujib system desalinates up to 38 million m^{3} (1.0×10^{10} US gal) per year of brackish water from the northeastern shore of the Dead Sea, stores it in Mujib Reservoir and pumps it to Amman, also covering a difference in altitude of 1,200 metres (3,900 ft).
- a pipeline from a wellfield near the Azraq oasis to the East, local wells, and a small wellfield South of Amman.

=== Red Sea-Dead Sea Canal ===
The abandoned Red Sea-Dead Sea Canal was a multibillion-dollar plan to build a canal from the Red Sea to the slowly evaporating Dead Sea. The project was also to incorporate the construction of a desalination plant. It was expected to provide Jordan with 500 million cubic metres of water annually. In August 2008, the Jordanian Minister of Water and Irrigation Raed Abu Soud denoted the project as "the solution to our water problems." The level of the Dead Sea has been continuously falling since the early 1930s at an average rate of 0·7 m per year. The water level, as of February 1998, is about 410·9 m below mean sea level. The canal has been abandoned primarily due to cost overruns. This leaves Jordan relying on its neighbor Israel for the additional water it needs. Israel has a water surplus due to its research and investment in large scale reverse osmosis desalination, and as such is supplying Jordan with twice the water Israel agreed to in the Israel-Jordan Peace Plan. This is difficult due to Israel depending on reverse osmosis desalination for 80% of its own water needs.

== Responsibility for water supply and sanitation ==
=== Legal framework ===
Water and sanitation are regulated mainly by the Water Authority of Jordan Law No. 18 of 1988 and its amendments, Jordan Valley Authority Law No. 30 of 2001 and Ministry of Water and Irrigation Law No. 54 of 1992 and its amendments. Other relevant laws include Public Health Law No. 47 of 2008, Environmental Protection Law No. 85 of 2006 and Groundwater By-Law No. 85 of 2002. Jordan does not yet have a comprehensive water law, although a draft law is being discussed. The bill is supposed to define the structure and functions of the different ministries and other institutions managing the water and sanitation sectors. The UN Special Rapporteur on the human right to safe water drinking water and sanitation stated in a 2014 report: "[a]dopting a comprehensive water law, is an important first step for the realization of the human right to water and to sanitation."

=== Policy and regulation ===
The Ministry of Water and Irrigation (MWI) is the official apex body responsible for the formulation of national water strategies, policies and planning, subject to approval by the Council of Ministers. The MWI has been established in 1988 through a bylaw. The establishment of the MWI was in response to Jordan's recognition for the need of a more integrated approach to national water management. Since its establishment, MWI has been supported by several donor organizations that have assisted in the development of water policy and water master planning as well as in restructuring the water sector. Two key agencies in the water sector are under the authority of the Ministry: The first of them is the Water Authority of Jordan (WAJ) which is mainly in charge of water and sanitation service provision. It provides its services directly or through public companies that it owns (see below). Moreover, WAJ is also responsible, together with the Ministry, for water resources planning and monitoring. It also regulates water abstraction by all users, including itself, by issuing licenses. WAJ thus combines both regulatory and service provision functions.

The second institution directly subordinate to the MWI is the Performance Monitoring Unit (PMU), previously called Programme Management Unit. It is in charge of projects with private sector participation. It has also carried out major investment projects such as the water loss reduction program in Amman and has regulated the private operator in Amman from 1999 to 2006. The PMU was supposed to be an embryonic unit for a future semi-autonomous water regulatory agency for the entire country, to be established by law outside of the Ministry of Water and Irrigation. As a step in that direction, a Water Sector Audit Unit (WSAU) was established in the PMU in May 2008. The unit has set up a benchmarking system using performance indicators that have initially been applied to the Aqaba Water Company and Miyahuna. Due to the absence of a regulatory agency, tariff setting is the responsibility of the Cabinet, after proposal from the Ministry of Water and Irrigation.

=== Service providers ===
WAJ is responsible for planning, construction, operation and maintenance of the public water supply and sewer services either directly or indirectly through its subsidiaries. It has been established as an autonomous corporate body, with financial and administrative independence linked with the Minister of Water and Irrigation.

One of WAJ's subsidiaries is the Aqaba Water Company (AWC), a public company established in August 2004 as Jordan's first semi-autonomous water utility. It is owned by WAJ (85%) and the Aqaba Special Economic Zone (ASEZA; 15%) whose establishment triggered the establishment of AWC. A second public water company, the Jordan Water Company (Miyahuna), was set up in 2006 for the Governorate of Amman. The company, which was created to take over service responsibility from a private operator, is a 100% subsidiary of WAJ. A third public company, the Yarmouk Water Company (YWC), has been be set up in 2010, serving the four Northern Governorates of Jordan, namely Irbid, Jerash, Ajloun and Mafraq. YWC is also a 100% subsidiary of WAJ and replaces the Northern Governorates Water Administration (NGWA). In 2013 Miyahuna was given the responsibility for water supply and sanitation in Madaba Governorate and in January 2014 in Zarqa Governorate under public-public management contracts, while the employees in these two governorates remain employees of WAJ.

==== Private participation ====
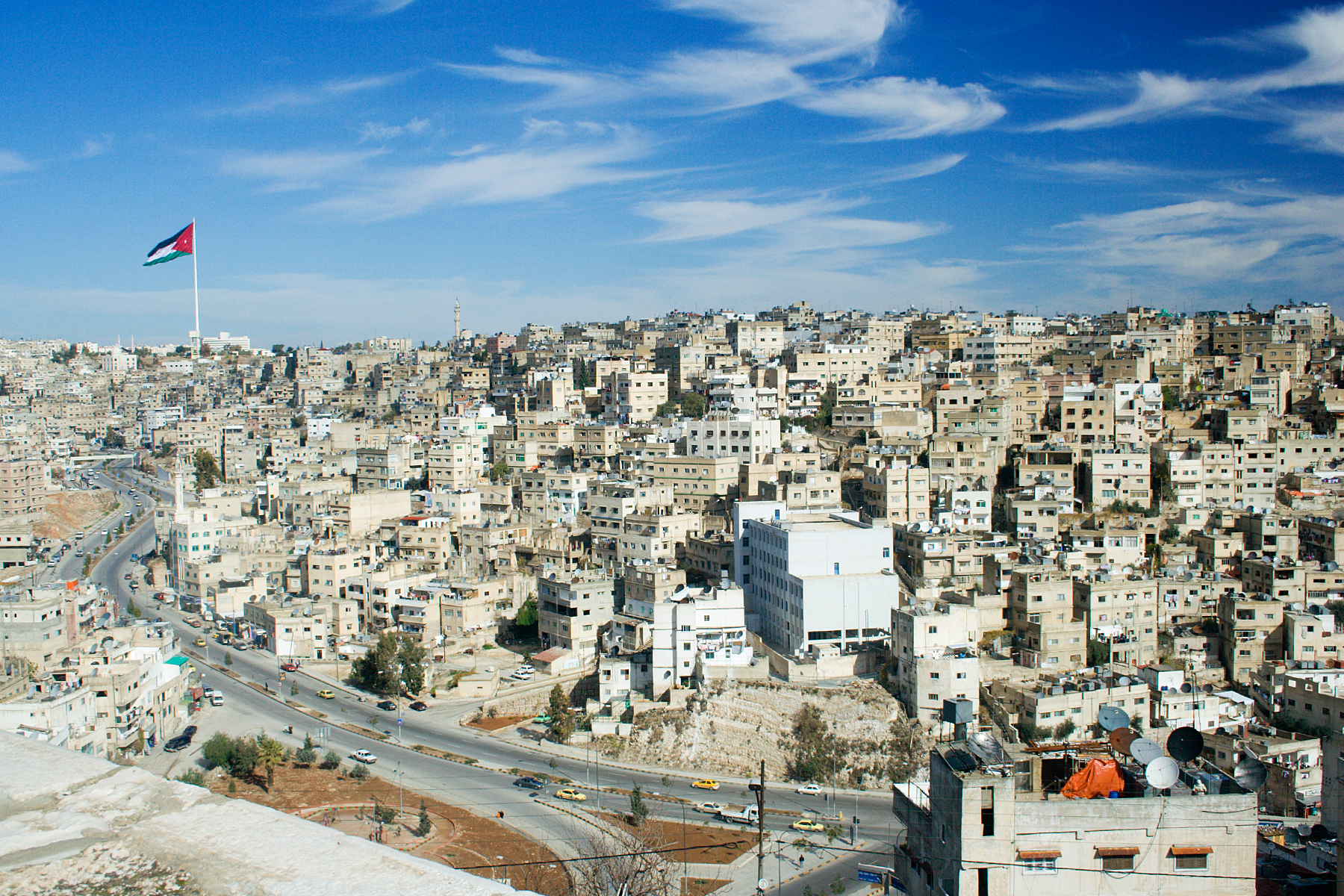
Water distribution and sewerage in Amman were operated by a private French company from 1999 to 2006.

Amman management contract. In 1999, a public-private partnership (PPP) started with the signing of a Management Contract between WAJ and the private joint venture Lyonnaise des Eaux - Montgomery Watson - Arabtech Jardaneh (LEMA), led by the French company Lyonnaise des Eaux, now known as Suez Environnement. According to the contract, LEMA was responsible for operating and managing water and wastewater services in the Greater Amman area on behalf of WAJ. The original five-year contract which began in August 1999 was extended until December 2006. The contract was intended to strengthen the technical structure and management capability as well as to develop the skills and knowledge of the staff. To this end, a small team of experienced expatriates worked with, and trained, around 1250 local staff. LEMA received treated water from number of WAJ sources. It also collected wastewater and transported it to treatment plants. The company was able to comply with 12 out of 15 performance targets. In the service area, i.e. in the Amman Governorate, access to supply increased from 90% in 2000 to universal access in 2005. At the same time, sewer connections increased from 69% to 80%. In 2007, the Jordan Water Company Miyahuna replaced LEMA after its contract had been extended one final time for an extra six months.

As-Samra Build-Operate-Transfer. The wastewater treatment plant As-Samra, the largest such plant in Greater Amman, is being operated by a consortium led by SUEZ under a 25-year Build-Operate-Transfer (BOT) contract with WAJ.

Madaba Micro Private Sector Participation. In the Madaba Governorate, a different model of private sector participation (PSP), called Micro PSP, has been carried out starting in 2006. The Micro PSP involved outsourcing customer service operations to Engicon, a local operator hired on a three-year performance-based contract. Aims of the project were to improve water and wastewater revenue, to increase the billing rate and to develop the customer management organisation, thereby improving efficiency. To achieve this, Engicon trained staff, surveyed and mapped all subscribers and regulated routes to meter readers (to eliminate reader monopoly). The Micro-PSP with Engicon had a variety of positive effects for the Madaba Water Administration: As a result of the cooperation, the Madaba Water Administration could start issuing its own bills instead of having to rely on WAJ structures. The accuracy of meter reading improved and net billed water increased by 75%. Net collections increased from 0.9 million in 2005 to 1.9 million in 2008. The levels of non-revenue water (NRW) initially dropped from an average of 45% to 34%, but in 2009 they were back at 40% due to an increase in water pumping pressure. Advantages of the Micro-PSP model include the fact that WAJ maintained asset ownership and that all revenue collected went to WAJ, so that investment costs could be fully recovered within 13 months of operation. The performance-based contract set strong incentives for the private operator to deliver concrete results.

=== Non-governmental organizations ===
More than 15 non-governmental organizations (NGOs) work directly or indirectly on water issues in Jordan, including the Jordan Environment Society (JES) and the Royal Society for the Conservation of Nature. NGOs carry out awareness projects and provide support to community projects together with national and international partners. NGOs are particularly engaged in water harvesting and water reuse. The Royal Scientific Society, through its Environmental Research Center, undertakes applied research including water quality assessments and wastewater management.

=== Community-based solutions ===
In addition to large-scale solutions there are also several community-based approaches aiming at a more sustainable use of Jordan's water resources. An important fosterer of these small-scale community-based approaches is the “Community Based Initiatives for Water Demand Management Project” (CBIWD), a project organised by the Ministry of Water and Irrigation in cooperation with Mercy Corps, the Jordan River Foundation and the Royal Scientific Society which is supported by USAID. The CBIWD supports a variety of project types, among them e.g. rainwater harvesting and greywater reuse projects.

The rainwater harvesting projects are mostly located in Jordan's North since rainfall is higher in this region than in the rest of the country. The communities, who are often not connected to the piped network, use harvested rainwater instead of or complementary to piped freshwater.

Concerning the reuse of greywater, Jordan's Ministry of Water promotes this alternative source especially in the agricultural sector, but also in hotels, government premises and on the individual household level. The most important motivation for using greywater - next to saving freshwater - is to cut down water bills.

== Non-Revenue Water ==
The share of non-revenue water (NRW) - water which is produced but not billed - was estimated at approx. 50% nationwide in 2014. This amounts to an estimated physical leakage of 76 billion litres per year, which could meet the needs of 2.6 million people (more than a third of the population). The main reasons leading to this high rate are leakage, by-passing of meters, illegal connections, unreliable water meters and problems concerning the reading of those meters. Leakages also affect water pressure and quality. Stolen water is used for irrigation or sold through water tankers, which reduces the amount available for official water supply and increases the price. Measures to decrease the rate of NRW can thus contribute to relieve the high pressure on water resources. The Government, in its National Water Strategy, aims at reducing non-revenue water to 25% by 2022, and technical losses to below 15%. The Strategy thus also includes strengthening the criminalization of water theft and illegal wells. Under a nationwide campaign to end water theft and violations on water networks and resources, the Ministry of Water and Irrigation, water companies and security authorities sealed 26 illegal wells in January 2015, seized and confiscated 30 drilling rigs, as well as dismantled 408 illegal fixtures on water mains and pipes across the Kingdom. According to WAJ, hundreds of thousands of stolen and wasted cubic metres of water have been saved since a “serious crackdown” on water theft and violations was initiated in August 2013.

In Amman, the level of non-revenue water has been reduced from an estimated 46% in 2005 to an estimated 34% in 2010. However, during the same period the average hours of service per week declined from 66 to 36.

The UN Special Rapporteur on the human right to safe drinking water and sanitation called in a 2014 report on donors to prioritize their cooperation in tackling non-revenue water through small scale, effective interventions.

Jordan wants to reduce non-revenue water from about 50% of total national supply to 25% of total supply to urban systems by 2040. The Ministry of Water and Irrigation estimates that the investment required to achieve this goal would be €1.7 billion over the next ten years. At an international summit in Amman in March 2022, $1.83 billion in grants and loans were offered for the project. According to Jordan's Ministry of Water and Irrigation, new offers have brought the total to $2.35 billion.

== Financial aspects ==
=== Cost recovery ===
Water and sewer services in Jordan are heavily subsidized. The revenue covers only part of the operation and maintenance costs, especially after the near-doubling of electricity tariffs in 2011 since 14% of electricity in Jordan is used to pump drinking water and to treat wastewater. Subsidies to the water sector amount to more than 0.4% of GDP.

=== Tariff structure and level ===
Water and sewer tariffs in Jordan are differentiated by geographic area, type of use and volume of use. In areas served by public companies - the governorates of Amman, Aqaba, Irbid, Jerash, Ajloun and Mafraq - tariffs are higher than in the rest of the country where services are provided by WAJ. Residential water and sewer tariffs use an increasing-block system, under which users pay a higher tariff per m^{3} if they consume more water. The first block, corresponding to a consumption of 18m^{3} per quarter, is a minimum charge independent of the amount of water consumed. Water and sewer tariffs for non-residential use (commercial and industrial users) are about ten to twenty times higher respectively than residential water and sewer tariffs in the lowest consumption block.

In areas served by public companies, as of 2015, the residential minimum charge was JD5.22/quarter for water and sewerage. This corresponds to an average water tariff of JD0.14/m^{3} and a sewer tariff of JD0.04/m^{3} for 18m^{3} per quarter. For a consumption level of 36m^{3} per quarter the average water and sewer tariff was JD0.24/m^{3} and JD0.14/m^{3} respectively. The tariff for each next m^{3} increases until it reaches JD1.92/m^{3} and JD1.11/m^{3} respectively for water and sewerage at a consumption of more than 122 m^{3}/quarter. Tariffs for non-residential customers were JD1.30/m^{3} and 0,87 m^{3} respectively above a consumption of 6 m^{3}/quarter, independently of the level of consumption. There is also a sewerage tax that is set at 3% of the assessed property value, which is charged in addition to the sewer tariff. Despite rising property values the sewerage tax revenue has remained constant for many years at JD15m per year, representing less than 10% of water revenues.

=== Tariff adjustments ===
Any adjustment of water tariffs requires Cabinet approval. In September 2009, King Abdullah stated that water tariffs would not be increased. In June 2010 the government announced the first tariff increase since 1997, emphasizing that low-volume consumers would not be affected because the tariff in the first block remained unchanged. The tariff increase, said to amount to only 9% for volumes beyond the first block, would become effective in January 2011. At the same time, the billing cycle was changed from every three months to monthly. Furthermore, tariffs in five governorates were silently substantially increased to the same level as in Amman. In February 2012 the Cabinet decided to return to the quarterly billing cycle and to further increase tariffs in the higher blocks of consumption.

=== Affordability ===
Combined water and sewer bills amount, on average, to less than 0.5% of total household expenditures and are thus quite affordable. The intermittent supply leads many to rely on bottled or tanked water, which is about 8 to 10 times higher than piped water, so that total household expenditures are often much higher than the utility bill. Prices paid to water vendors are 4 to 8 JD per m^{3}. In 2007 it was estimated that an average poor household with 6 members in the Middle Governorates spends 31-39 JD per year on its water and sewer bill at a consumption of 70 liter/capita/day, corresponding to only 0.4% of household expenditures. However, if other items are added the picture changes substantially: it costs 35 JD per year to depreciate the cost of a 2 m^{3} rooftop storage tank over 10 years; 160 JD per year to buy 2 liters/capita/day of bottled water at a price of 0.04 JD per liter (0.80 JD per canister of 5 gallons); and 153 JD per year to buy the equivalent of 28 liters/capita/day at a price of 2.50 JD/m^{3} from water vendors. This amounts to 374 JD per year and household, corresponding to 6.3% of expenditures. In addition, for households not connected to the sewer network the cost of emptying septic tanks at a cost between 21 and 40 JD per load needs to be added to calculate total water and sanitation expenditures. In conclusion, the cost of the water bill thus is only a fraction of total water expenditures, and household water expenditures could be lowered significantly if a sufficient quantity of good quality water was supplied on a reliable basis.

=== Investment ===
Jordan's Water Strategy 2009–2022 includes investments of Jordanian Dinar 5.86 billion (US$8.24 billion) over a period of 15 years, corresponding to more than 160% of Jordan's GDP. According to an earlier water sector investment plan for the time from 1998 to 2010 (published in 1997), the estimated costs for water projects were US$1,916 million, while sanitation projects were estimated at US$926 million, corresponding to about US$240 million per year. Actual investments towards the end of that period were only slightly below these expected figures: They stood at 900m JD in the six years from 2005 to 2010, averaging 150m JD (US$215) or 28 JD (US$40) per capita.

=== Financing ===
In the period 2005–10, public investments in water supply and sanitation were financed from the following sources:

- JD 325m (36%) through the sale of WAJ bonds:
- JD 305m (34%) by the Jordanian treasury;
- JD 255m (27%) through grants from foreign donors.
- JD 30m (3%) through foreign loans.

WAJ local currency bonds had a maturity of only three years, are government-guaranteed and pay 4 to 7% interest. WAJ debt increased by 900% to JD 621 million in only five years. 73% of grants were provided by USAID. Since then, the share of loan financing in total financing has increased, including loans from Germany and France.

Additional financing not included in the figures above is obtained from private sources through Build-Operate-Transfer (BOT) projects. There are two such projects in the water sector, one to finance the Samra wastewater treatment plant and the other and largest one to finance the Disi-Amman carrier. The latter is partially financed by about US$190 million of private equity from GAMA Energy, a joint venture between the Turkish firm GAMA Holding and the US firm General Electric Energy Financial Services. In addition, the government provided a grant of US$300 million and loans totaling US$475 million by the Overseas Private Investment Corporation of the United States, the European Investment Bank and Proparco of France.

The European Investment Bank will lend the Jordanian government in 2023 €200 million for its participation to the Aqaba-Amman Water Desalination and Conveyance Project. This is Jordan's largest-ever water investment project's first confirmed finance. It will assist the country in addressing the difficulties of increasingly restricted water resources and adapting to climate change.

== External cooperation ==
The major external public donors in Jordan's water supply and sanitation are the United States, Japan, Germany and the European Union, primarily through the European Investment Bank (EIB). Other donors are the United Nations (UN), the World Bank, the Islamic Development Bank, the Kuwait Fund for Arab Economic Development, the Saudi Fund for Development, the Abu Dhabi Fund, the Arab Fund for Economic and Social Development, Italy, France, Norway, South Korea, The Netherlands, Canada, Spain, Sweden, China and Libya. The following paragraphs summarize the cooperation with some of Jordan's most active external partners in the water sector.

=== European Investment Bank ===
The European Investment Bank (EIB) approved two loans for the rehabilitation of the water supply network in Greater Amman in 1996 and 1998 for a total of 49 million Euro. WAJ has benefited from 8 EIB loans amounting to 61.5 million Euro between 1984 and 1998.

The Jordanian government has collaborated with the European Investment Bank and Team Europe, and other international agencies to come up with an infrastructure for the Aqaba-Amman Water Desalination and Conveyance Project. The project is estimated to cost €3 billion and will employ 4000 people throughout the building period. The European Investment Bank first signed the funding to the project in December 2022, with a €200 million loan.

=== France ===
The French Development Agency AFD and its private investment arm PROPARCO support the Disi-Amman conveyor through two projects, each of US$100 million, approved in 2009.

=== Germany ===
Germany has been engaged in supporting the Jordanian water sector for several decades through three agencies: GIZ (Deutsche Gesellschaft für Internationale Zusammenarbeit) in charge of technical cooperation, the development Bank KfW in charge of financial cooperation and the Federal Geological Agency BGR in charge of hydro-geological studies.

GIZ. The German technical cooperation agency GIZ (Deutsche Gesellschaft für Internationale Zusammenarbeit) supports the Management of Water Resources Programme initiated in 2006. The Jordanian partner is the MWI. The main objective of the program is to increase sustainable use of the available water resources. Furthermore, it seeks to resolve conflicts between the different water demanding sectors, namely the domestic, industrial and agricultural sector. To achieve these objectives, the program "examines legal and institutional frameworks", offers training, supports the establishment of databases and sets up "organisational structures and processes to improve efficiency". The use of treated wastewater in agriculture and the establishment of water user associations is encouraged. GIZ works together with German companies which participate under the framework of a public-private partnership.

KfW. The German government-owned development Bank KfW has a series of water and sanitation projects in Jordan with a total commitment of Euro 245m in 2009. The currently largest project supports the extension of sewer networks and the construction of a wastewater treatment plant in Irbid through a Euro 62.95m loan approved in 2000. The treated wastewater is to be reused for irrigated agriculture. Other projects approved around 2000 include a Water Loss Reduction project for Irbid and Jerash (EUR 18.2 m loan), a Water Loss Reduction project for the Northern Governorates (EUR 21.7 m loan and EUR 3.5 m grant), a Water Loss Reduction project in Karak (EUR 16.2 m loan and EUR 2.24 m grant) and a sanitation project in Karak and Kofranjah (EUR 15m loan and EUR 1.45m in grants). In 2006, KfW approved another series of loans, including for a third project supporting the reduction of distribution losses in Amman in partnership with other donors through an 11m Euro loan with the objective of saving 2.5 million m^{3} of water per year, enough to provide 70,000 beneficiaries with water. Other projects approved around 2006 include a project for water transmission in the Northern Governorates (EUR 15 m loan) and a project for water management in the Middle Governorates (EUR 5.3 m loan). In 2009, KfW modified its cooperation with Jordan from a project approach to a program approach, bundling its new funding in a single "Water Resources Management Program" (2009–2014) that covers water loss reduction, sanitation and the use of reclaimed water from Irbid for irrigation in the Northern Jordan Valley. The new program approach is expected to allow flexible responses to changing circumstances.

Past projects financed by KfW include a water supply project in Wadi Musa; an integrated poverty-oriented project targeted at refugees and squatters which included investments in water supply and sanitation; sewage disposal for Greater Irbid; and a trunk sewer and associated pumping stations linking up to the wastewater treatment plant As-Samra near Amman. In Wadi Musa the Euro 11.3 million project achieved, for a brief period, continuous water supply as well as a reduction in distribution losses. The project was co-financed by France and, concerning sanitation, by the US. The Euro 16.3 m poverty-oriented infrastructure project implemented by the Housing and Urban Development Corporation (HUDCO) of Jordan increased access to water and sanitation in two squatter settlements and four refugee camps. The investments in the camps were chosen in close dialogue with the residents who were organized in Community Improvement Committees, and were carried out between 1999 and 2002. The project complemented the World Bank-financed Community Infrastructure Development Project. The Euro 60.1 m Greater Irbid sewage disposal project (1994–2002) included the construction of two wastewater treatment plants and the associated sewer infrastructure connecting 202,000 residents, as well as training for operational staff. Both treatment plants operated satisfactorily four years after they had been completed. Residual sludge is being properly disposed on a landfill.

UFZ. The Helmholtz-Centre for Environmental Research – UFZ GmbH, a member of the Helmholtz Association of German Research Centres, has been supporting the Jordanian government in the water sector for more than 15 years.The existing strong link between the Ministry of Water and Irrigation (MWI) and the so-called SMART research project (since 2006), funded by the German Federal Ministry of Education and Research (BMBF), has led to the opportunity to jointly prepare and support the implementation process of sustainable wastewater management systems with a focus on suburban and rural areas of Jordan. Since 2010, the UFZ has been operating a research and demonstration site in Fuheis, where 11 water treatment plants have been operated, developed and adapted to Jordanian conditions. The site also serves as an information platform to exchange experiences with citizens, local and regional decision-makers, students and scientists. It also carried out training activities with pupils, students, scientists and experts from companies and government agencies. Today the site is under the responsibility of the Al-Balqa Applied University. In 2012, on the recommendation of the Secretary General of the MWI, a cooperation between the UFZ and the MWI was initiated to establish an implementation office in Amman (NICE-Office). The local presence within the MWI played a crucial role in gaining stakeholder acceptance and facilitating the implementation of this innovative wastewater approach. The office organised working group meetings, provided technical guidance to decision-makers and, drawing on the expertise of experts in Germany, drafted a major contribution to structural water protection in Jordan. In addition, the MWI established an inter-ministerial National Implementation Committee for Effective Integrated Wastewater Management in Jordan – NICE in 2013 to develop regulatory and administrative tools for the implementation of decentralised wastewater management systems in Jordan. NICE was supported by the NICE Office and focused on key elements such as technology and reuse standards, site selection procedures, operation and maintenance schemes for an institutional framework as well as for selected initial implementation areas in Jordan. In 2016, the Jordanian cabinet adopted the first decentralised wastewater management policy in the Arab world (DWWM-Policy), with the active participation of the German team. This marked a significant commitment to deploy decentralised wastewater systems across the country to protect groundwater resources, an innovative initiative that has attracted the attention of other countries. The DWWM Policy played a crucial role as part of Jordan's National Water Strategy 2016–2025, emphasising the country's commitment to sustainable water management practices (National Water Strategy 2016-2025). In 2018, the UFZ team was awarded the German Environmental Prize by the German Federal Environmental Foundation – DBU (Deutsche Bundesstiftung Umwelt – DBU) for the development of principles for decentralised wastewater solutions and their political implementation in Jordan (www.dbu.de). In March 2020, NICE received the mandate from the Jordanian Cabinet to play a coordinating and steering role in the implementation of integrated wastewater system solutions.

Embracing the principles of integrated water and resource management is critical to addressing the challenges of severe water scarcity. In the second phase of the NICE Office (2017–2021), five pieces of work have been developed, which together form a comprehensive strategy to secure Jordan's groundwater resources:

- Vulnerable Water Resources in Jordan: Hot Spots.
- Reuse of Treated Wastewater and Biosolids in Jordan – Nationwide Evaluation.
- Influx of Syrian Refugees in Jordan | Effects on the Water Sector.
- National Framework: The Certification of Wastewater Treatment Systems with Capacities up to 5.000 PE in Jordan.
- Integrated Wastewater Management for the Protection of Vulnerable Water Resources in the North of Jordan.

=== Japan ===
Japan supports the Jordanian water sector primarily through three projects:

- Improving water supply in Zarqa Governorate (4.1bn Yen or about US$41 million grants from 2002 to 2010), including through loss reduction, reaching a total of 780,000 residents in East Zarqa (Awajan) and Russeifa (Phase I) and in Zarqa City (West Zarqa), Hashmeyeh and Sukhna (Phase II).
- Reduction of non-revenue water (NRW) through technical assistance, beginning in Amman in 1999, followed by pilot activities in parts of 10 governorates (2005–2008) and eight more pilot activities in six governorates during a "Phase 2" (2009–2011). During Phase 2 non-revenue water in the pilot areas was reduced from an average of 49% to only 22%, according to JICA.
- Energy conservation through the upgrading of the water supply network in Zarqa Governorate (about US$12 million) since 2009. The program also includes technical assistance for operation and maintenance.

Japanese aid is in the form of grants administered by the Japan International Cooperation Agency (JICA). Japanese assistance is tied, meaning that consultants and contractors have to be from Japan. An important completed project supported by Japan was the doubling the capacity of Zai Water Treatment Plant on the carrier from Deirala in the Jordan Valley to Amman to 250 million liter/day, covering a population of 1.9 million people (US$79.1 million grant, 1998–2001).

=== United States ===
US assistance to the water and sanitation sector in Jordan is provided through the United States Agency for International Development (USAID) and the Millennium Challenge Corporation (MCC).

USAID support for infrastructure. Under the Wadi Ma’in, Zara and Mujib water treatment and conveyance project, the United States Agency for International Development (USAID) funded a water treatment plant that delivers 100,000 m^{3} of water per day to about 700,000 people in the Greater Amman area. The treatment plant captures water from brackish streams which is desalinated using reverse osmosis. The remaining highly saline water (brine) is discharged to the Dead Sea. Also in Amman, in addition to the $125 million Zara Ma’in Water Supply project mentioned above, USAID partially funded the construction of the As Samra $167 million build-operate-transfer (BOT) contract for wastewater treatment of 60 million m^{3} per year. Approximately 46% of the cost was provided by USAID in the form of a grant. Furthermore, USAID is implementing a $72 million component of the multi-donor rehabilitation of Amman's potable water distribution system. In Aqaba, USAID also supported the rehabilitation and expansion of a $31 million wastewater treatment plant and rehabilitation of the water distribution system.

Technical assistance and training by USAID. The USAID-funded Watershed Management project strengthened the relationship between the Ministries of Health and Water related to water standards and regulations, Quality Assurance/Quality Control program for laboratories, and new procedures that aim at reducing water treatment plant shutdowns. A Water Demand Management (WDM) Unit was established at the Ministry of Water and Irrigation with assistance from USAID, and a WDM curriculum has been inserted into Jordanian classroom textbooks from grades 1 through 11. A Master's degree program has been established at Jordan University of Science and Technology, and journalists have been trained. Auditing and retrofitting of public and private buildings (hotels, schools, hospitals, government and commercial) indicated that 40 to 60% are now using water-saving devices. A “model” community was rehabilitated to demonstrate water and associated energy conservation. Twenty-seven grants have been awarded to poor communities to alleviate water shortages and inefficient water usage. Furthermore, training courses under a program with Washington State University have been completed for more than 800 employees from the Jordan Valley Authority, Water Authority of Jordan and Ministry of Water and Irrigation to improve and standardize accounting systems, and to improve efficiency.

Millennium Challenge Corporation. In October 2010, the Millennium Challenge Corporation (MCC) and the Jordanian government signed a US$275.1m grant agreement to expand water distribution, wastewater collection and the As Samra wastewater treatment plant, all in the Zarqa governorate.

=== Switzerland ===
Switzerland has a long going partnership on water issues, including sanitation, hygiene (WASH), transboundary management, flood risk mapping, and diplomacy, formalized via multiple MoUs and programs to tackle Jordan's severe water scarcity. Key initiatives include a 10-year JD11.5 million agreement for WASH and transboundary efforts benefiting vulnerable communities and refugees; a recent MoU on disaster risk reduction for flood mapping; Swiss Agency for Development and Cooperation (SDC) support through the Amman office with CHF 22 million annually; a new $3.5 million UNICEF pact for climate-resilient water services in refugee camps and host areas; and coral reef conservation in Aqaba. This collaboration, coordinated by Switzerland's regional office, emphasizes capacity building, wastewater treatment innovations like Azraq's decentralized plant, and sustainable resource management for Jordanians and refugees.

=== World Bank ===
From 1999 to 2007, the World Bank contributed with US$55 million to the Amman Water and Sanitation Management Project. One objective of the project was to lay the groundwork for sustainable private participation in the sector through a management contract. According to the World Bank, although the management was not extended, "the management operator was able to comply substantially with 12 of 15 performance targets" and, in the seven and a half years of the project, "the practice of modern utility management was introduced, and the accountability of the operator was established".

== Water theft ==
Jordan has been facing a great problem of illegal power use, damaging its water security. It has become a custom in Jordan that people and businesses often get water illegally by digging illegal wells, secretly connecting to city water pipes, tampering with meters, or taking water from canals like the King Abdullah Canal. Because of this, an unregulated tanker market has grown, moving water from villages to cities and selling it at very high prices. These illegal practices cause almost half of the country's water to be lost and make city supplies even worse—residents often get water only one or two days a week. To deal with this, the Jordanian government, with help from groups like the IFC and USAID, has created a National Water Strategy (2023–2040). The plan aims to improve water meters, enforce the law more strongly, close illegal wells, and cut water losses to less than 25% by 2040.

== See also ==
- Adaptation to climate change in Jordan
- King Abdullah Canal
- Aqaba–Amman Water Desalination and Conveyance Project
