= Sharhabil Bin Hassneh EcoPark =

Coordinates: 32.5269°N 35.6175°E

The Sharhabil Bin Hassneh EcoPark is a nature reserve in northern Jordan managed by Friends of the Earth Middle East. In the early 2000s, Friends of the Earth Middle East (FoEME) mapped the area identifying environmental threats, and was given 11 hectares (110 dunums) of land by the Jordan Valley Authority, which includes the Ziqlab Dam. The EcoPark was established in 2004, when groups of volunteers began removing trash from the site and planting local plants and trees. The park had its official opening on 12 April 2011 under the patronage of Prince Hassan bin Talal. Furthermore, Jordanian Representatives and Senators were present, as was the European ambassador to Jordan. In addition to ecological restoration, Friends of the Earth Middle East created tourism infrastructure, including cabins, a welcome center, a conference room, a picnic area, a campsite, and several trails. The infrastructure is supported by sustainable energy and water use projects, including a waste-water treatment system, solar power, and energy efficient appliances. The park also sponsors environmental education activities and workshops.
