= King Abdullah Canal =

Largest irrigation canal system in Jordan

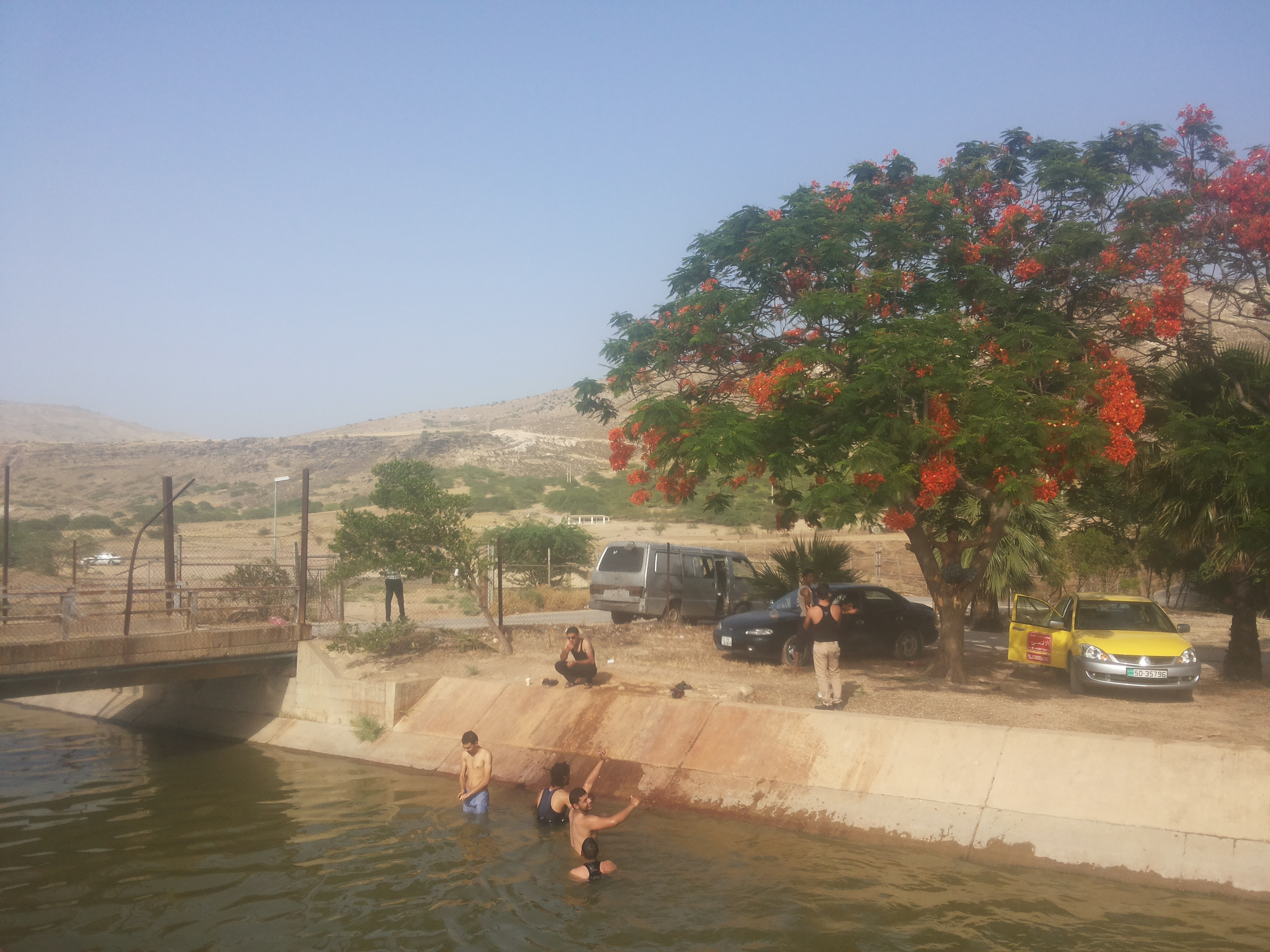
King Abdullah I Canal in Jordan valley

The King Abdullah Canal is the largest irrigation canal system in Jordan and runs parallel to the east bank of the Jordan River. It was previously known as the East Ghor Main Canal and renamed in 1987 after Abdullah I of Jordan.

== Water sources and technical features ==
The main water source for the King Abdullah Canal (KAC) is the Yarmouk River and the Al-Mukhaibeh wells within the Yarmouk valley: farther south, additional water flows from Wadi el-Arab and from the Zarqa River, and its reservoir behind King Talal Dam. As a result of the 1994 Israel–Jordan peace treaty, some Yarmouk River water is also stored seasonally in Lake Tiberias, being conveyed through a pipe. The canal's design capacity is 20 m^{3}/second at the northern entrance of the Canal and 2.3 m^{3}/second at its southern end. Water flows by gravity along its 110 km length, ranging in elevation from about 230 meters below sea level to almost 400 meters below. The Canal supplies water for irrigation and 90 million cubic meters/year of drinking water for Greater Amman through the Deir Allah-Amman carrier, which has been constructed in two phases in the mid-80s and in the early 2000s. The Zarqa River contains a mixture of treated wastewater and natural water flow, which influences the water quality downstream of the Zarqa River intake into the KAC.

== History ==
The canal was designed in 1957 and was built in phases. Construction began in 1959, and the first section was completed in 1961. By 1966, the upstream portion to Wadi Zarqa was completed. The canal was then 70 km in length, and was subsequently extended three times between 1969 and 1987. The United States, through United States Agency for International Development (USAID) provided financing for the initial phase of project, after obtaining explicit assurances from the Jordanian government that Jordan would not withdraw more water from the Yarmouk than the amount allocated to it according to the Johnston Plan. It was also involved in later phases.

The original canal was part of a larger project - the Greater Yarmouk project - which envisioned two storage dams on the Yarmouk, and a future West Ghor Canal, on the West Bank of the Jordan. This other canal was never built, because Israel captured the West Bank from Jordan during the 1967 Six-Day War. After the Six-Day War, the Palestine Liberation Organization (PLO) operated from bases within Jordan, and launched several attacks on Israeli settlements in the Jordan Valley, including attacks on water facilities. Israel responded with raids in Jordan, in an attempt to force king Hussein to rein in the PLO. The canal was the target of at least four of these raids, and was virtually knocked out of commission. The United States intervened to resolve the conflict, and the canal was repaired after Hussein undertook to stop PLO activity in the area.

On June 2, 2025 The Jordan Valley Authority, supported by the Ministry of Water and Irrigation and security forces, uncovered and removed 873 illegal water-access violations along the 110 km King Abdullah Canal between January and May 2025—primarily unauthorized siphoning for irrigation and pool-filling. This enforcement operation successfully reclaimed approximately 226,107 m³ of water, raising canal efficiency from 82 % to 87 %, and led to the confiscation of pumps, the referral of seven legal cases, and multiple violators being summoned. These efforts, backed by toughened legislation imposing fines and prison terms, are ongoing to further safeguard Jordan’s vital water resources.

== See also ==
- Water supply and sanitation in Jordan
- Red Sea–Dead Sea Water Conveyance Project
- Reverse osmosis
- Jordan River
- Aqaba–Amman Water Desalination and Conveyance Project
