= Mohammed Al Najjar =

Jordanian politician (born 1956)

Ministry of Water and Irrigation
- In office 7 March 2021 – 27 September 2023
- Monarch: Abdullah II of Jordan
- Prime Minister: Bisher Al-Khasawneh
- Succeeded by: Raed Abu Soud

Personal details
- Born: 1956 (age 69–70)
- Education: Newcastle University (MSc)

Mohammed Al Najjar (born 1956) is a Jordanian politician. Previously he had served as Minister of Water and Irrigation from 7 March 2021 until 27 September 2023.

== Education ==
Al Najjar holds a Bachelor of Civil Engineering (1981) from the Krasnodar University and a Master of Environmental Engineering (1988) from the Newcastle University.
