= Aqaba–Amman Water Desalination and Conveyance Project =

Water infrastructure project in Jordan

The Aqaba–Amman Water Desalination and Conveyance Project (AAWDC), also known as the National Water Carrier of Jordan, is a major infrastructure project planned to solve Jordan’s ongoing water shortage. The project involves the desalination of seawater from the Red Sea at Aqaba that will then be transported to Amman and other highland regions across the country. This is the largest water project the Hashemite Kingdom of Jordan has ever planned. It is seen as a major solution to the country’s national water security and climate adaptation strategy.

== Overview ==
The AAWDC project aims to produce about 300 million cubic meters of clean drinking water each year by removing salt from seawater using reverse osmosis. This water will be carried through a pipeline over 450 kilometers, crossing high terrain to reach the capital city of Amman and other nearby towns and villages. With a planned capacity of 851,000 cubic meters of water per day, it will be the second largest desalination plant in the world, built all at once.

== Project components ==
Desalination plant The project will build a large water treatment plant near Aqaba on the Red Sea. This plant will use reverse osmosis to remove salt and other substances from seawater. It is also expected to use solar power to help lower pollution and reduce energy costs.

Water transport system

The project will build a pipeline system about 445 to 450 kilometers long to carry clean water from Aqaba in the south to Amman in the north, which is around 1,000 meters higher than sea level. The system will include booster pump stations to help move the water uphill, storage tanks to hold the water, and places along the way where towns and cities can access it.

Use of renewable energy

As part of Jordan’s plan to grow in an environmentally friendly way, the project will use renewable energy, mainly solar power from southern Jordan. A special solar power plant, producing between 310 and 724 megawatts of electricity, will supply most of the energy needed for the project. This supports Jordan’s national energy goals and efforts to fight climate change.

== Strategic significance ==
Jordan has very little water, with each person getting less than 100 cubic meters per year. This is much lower than the 500 cubic meters considered the minimum for basic needs. By 2030, the AAWDC project is expected to provide about one-third of the country’s total water supply. The project also aims to reduce Jordan’s dependence on water from sources that are affected by politics, like the Yarmouk River and agreements with Israel, and to help make water distribution more reliable across cities and villages.

== Funding, economics and social impact ==
The project is expected to cost over US$2.5 billion. The money will come from a mix of international donors, development banks, and private companies. The Jordanian Ministry of Water and Irrigation is in charge of the project, with help from organizations like the World Bank, the European Union, and countries in the Gulf Cooperation Council (GCC). By providing water for homes, businesses, farms, and tourism, the project will support economic growth, create jobs, and improve living conditions for millions of people in Jordan.

On 15 May 2025 it was reported that Jordan’s Minister of Water and Irrigation, Raed Abu Saud, announced a major financial agreement with Italy to support the country’s national water carrier project, securing a €50 million soft loan and a €2 million grant. The initiative, backed by King Abdullah II’s diplomatic efforts with the EU, aims to address Jordan's water scarcity by providing 300 million cubic meters of desalinated water annually.

== Current status ==
As of 2026, the project has finished its feasibility studies and environmental impact assessments. Construction is expected to start in 2027, with the first phase ready by 2030. In January 2025, Jordan signed an initial agreement with the Meridiam-SUEZ group, marking an important step forward. The project is supported by international development finance institutions such as the US International Development Finance Corporation, the US government, the European Union, Germany's KfW Group, France's AFD group, Italy, the European Bank for Reconstruction and Development (EBRD) and the European Investment Bank.

== See also ==
- Water supply and sanitation in Jordan
- Red Sea–Dead Sea Water Conveyance Project
- Reverse osmosis
- Jordan River
