= Climate change in Jordan =

Emissions, impacts and responses of Jordan related to climate change

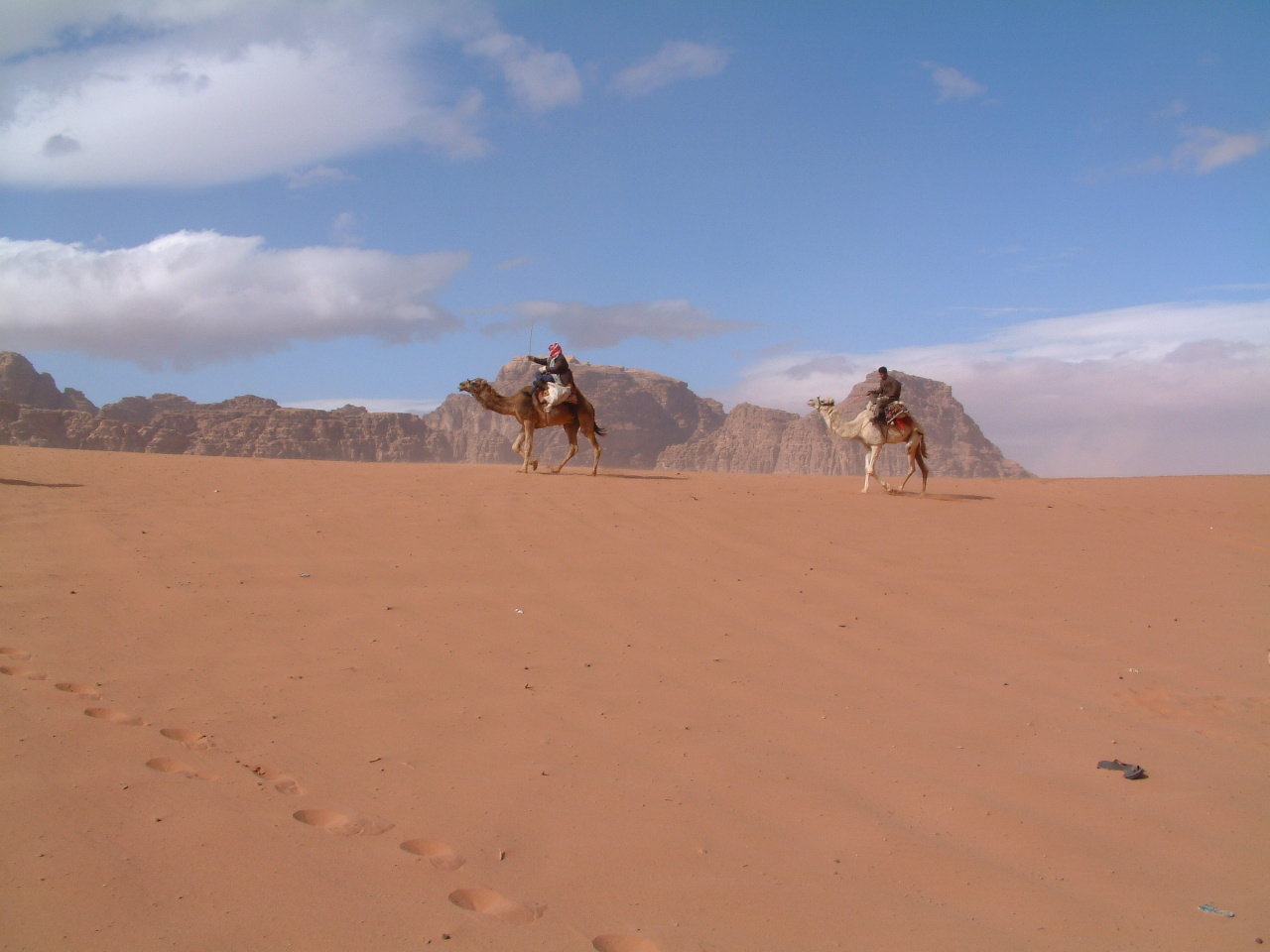
Jordan is mostly desert.

Climate change has a broad range of impacts in Jordan, including the already scarce water resources. The temperature increases adversely affect an already warmer and arid climate, and are accompanied by droughts, extreme temperatures, landslides and floods. Water resources in Jordan are scarce. Besides the rapid population growth, the impacts of climate change are likely to further exacerbate the problem. Temperatures will increase and the total annual precipitation is likely to decrease, however with a fair share of uncertainty. Hence, existing and new activities with the objective to minimize the gap between water supply and demand contribute to adapt Jordan to tomorrow's climate. This might be accompanied by activities improving Jordan's capacity to monitor and project meteorological and hydrological data and assess its own vulnerability to climate change.

Jordan has signed and ratified the Paris Treaty. It has updated its first Nationally Determined Contributions in 2021.

== Impacts on the natural environment ==
=== Temperature and weather changes ===
Köppen climate classification map for Jordan for 1980–2016

2071–2100 map under the most intense climate change scenario. Mid-range scenarios are currently considered more likely

Most of Jordan's territory is classified as desert. Summers are generally hot and dry, while winters can be cold in some areas. The annual rainfall varies from little more than 30 mm in desert areas up to 572 mm in the hilly northwest of Jordan. Almost all precipitation falls between October and May. In the Jordan Valley, winters are mild and summers very hot, with very little rainfall throughout the year.

Jordan's Second National Communication includes a chapter on observed and projected climate change in the country. Concerning the past, data for the period 1961-2005 (or shorter in some cases) of 19 meteorological stations all over Jordan were evaluated with the following results:

- The minimum temperature increased by 0.4-2.8 °C, the maximum temperature by 0.3-1.8 °C.
- 13 stations show a decreasing total annual precipitation by 5-20%. Six stations experienced an increase by 5-10%.
- The number of rainy days decreased by 3-10% in most of the stations
- In most stations, relative humidity decreased while evaporation increased

Another study comes to similar results. Using data from the last 30–83 years from six meteorological stations in Jordan, the minimum temperature increased while the maximum temperature did not change significantly. Concerning total annual precipitation however, no visible changing trends are visible.

The collected data from the 19 stations served as a baseline and were compared to baselines extracted from 13 General Circulation Models (GCMs), which are coarse models used by the Intergovernmental Panel on Climate Change in order to project climate change at the global level. The three GCMs whose grid points correlated most with the study area were then used to project the climate for the period 2005-2050. The results are the following:

- All models project a temperature increase by about 1-1.3 °C by 2050. Warming is projected to be stronger in the summer months.
- Concerning precipitation, the models do not agree. One model projects an increase in precipitation from October to May and a decrease in summer. Another model projects a decrease from November to April and the third model projects more rain in the months February to May and December and less rain in all other months.

The Second National Communication repeatedly addresses the limitations which were encountered during the preparation of the climate projections. Besides the uncertainties caused by the low resolution of GCMs and unclear emission developments, observational records were reported to be incomplete. Data in daily and monthly time series were missing in most meteorological stations. Moreover, the quality of available water data is described as partly inappropriate. According to the communication,

“the existing climatic and water resources monitoring in the country is facing permanent problems in operation, slow modernization of equipment and reducing of the monitoring network”.

The World Bank Climate Change Data Portal shows results which are similar to those of the Second National Communication. Five locations in different parts of Jordan (figure 1) were picked. Climate change for the period 2030-2049 was projected by several GCMs. The tool shows the number of GCMs agreeing in the direction of change, as shown in the table below.

	Projection (2030 - 2049 vs. 1980-1999)	Number of models projecting the same change
Mean Annual Precipitation	-11% to -18%	14 to 19 out of 20
Runoff	-20% to -21%	2 out of 12
Mean Annual Temperature	+2 °C	--
Daily Precipitation Intensity	+4% to +6%	6 to 7 out of 8
Consecutive Dry Days	-5 to +4 days	4 to 6 out of 8

According to the data portal, temperature is projected to increase in all locations. Precipitation is projected to decrease in all locations by most models, but there is a certain uncertainty in Amman, Aqaba and Ma’an, where about three quarters of the models agree. Precipitation intensity is projected to increase by at least three quarters of the models in all locations. The results concerning consecutive dry days are completely uncertain with half of the models projecting more and the other half less consecutive dry days. There seems to be an error concerning runoff, since the data portal shows impossible data concerning uncertainty.

To conclude, the most obvious development is an increase in temperatures. The total annual precipitation might decrease, but there is a significant share of uncertainty. Precipitation intensity is likely to increase. The trend of droughts is uncertain. Together with the challenges of the existing meteorological system, this uncertainty suggests a more detailed analysis possibly including the development of a regional climate model.

=== Water resources ===
Jordan is the seventeenth most water stressed country in the world.

Jordan's Second National Communication suggests that the rising temperatures will lead to a decrease in surface runoff at least in the two river basins Zarqa and Yarmouk which were chosen as pilot study areas. If the temperature rises by 2 °C, even an increase in precipitation by 20% would not compensate the increase in evaporation resulting in a decrease of surface runoff.

Given that situation, it is likely that climate change will lead to even more water scarcity in Jordan. Moreover, more intense precipitation is likely to affect the country. In detail, the following impacts are likely:

- Increasing water demand caused by warmer climate
- Reduction of water quantity in reservoirs
- Decreasing groundwater tables
- Deterioration of water quality caused by increasing water scarcity
- Conflicts among user groups (agriculture vs. domestic supply, industry, tourism)
- Damages through intense precipitation
- More Droughts and Heat Waves

National water and sanitation policies and strategies are formulated by the Ministry of Water and Irrigation (MWI) and need to be approved by the Council of Ministers. The ministry includes the Water Authority of Jordan (WAJ), which is responsible for water and sanitation service provision either directly or through its subsidiaries. In the Jordan Rift Valley, water and sanitation are managed by the Jordan Valley Authority (JVA). In 2009, climate change was not a main issue on the Jordanian water agenda. Jordan's Water Strategy 2008-2022 acknowledges that water scarcity will increase in the future. However, climate change plays a secondary role as driver of increasing water stress in the Water Strategy.

According to its Water Strategy, Jordan is one of the four driest countries in the world. Due to rapid population growth, water availability per capita has declined significantly, from 3,600 m³ per capita and year in 1946 to only 145 m³ in 2008. Water demand distinctly exceeds supply. Almost two thirds (64%) of the water is supplied for irrigation, while municipal use accounts for 30%, industry for 5% and tourism for 1%. In order to overcome the water crisis, the Jordanian Water Strategy focuses on demand management and an increase in water supply through the utilization of treated wastewater, the exploitation of the non renewable Disi aquifer and a canal from the Red Sea to the Dead Sea.

== Impacts on people ==
=== Economic impacts ===
==== Agriculture ====
Jordan's agricultural sector is particularly threatened by climate change and its impacts since it is the largest water user in Jordan. Climate change does not change the challenges in Jordan, which are mainly related to water scarcity. Instead, it is another factor contributing to aggravate the existing shortage, adding to the rapid population growth.

== Mitigation and adaptation ==
=== Possible adaptation activities ===
Adaptation measures in Jordan include a wide range of activities targeting water scarcity. Since water is already scarce in the Hashemite Kingdom, and not only threatened by climate change, all these activities can be categorized as no-regret measures, which make also sense even in the complete absence of the projected climate change. Activities which are directly targeting climate change are mostly limited to research activities.

==== No-Regret Measures ====
Activities that reduce the gap between water availability and demand are commonly regarded as "no-regret" adaptation measures because they provide benefits regardless of the magnitude of future climate change. Such measures include improving water-use efficiency, protecting water quality, expanding wastewater reuse, and increasing the resilience of water infrastructure. Although Jordan's water policies were not originally developed specifically as climate adaptation strategies, many of their objectives are consistent with recommended approaches for adapting the country's water sector to climate change.

- Activities concerning water quality, e.g. groundwater protection
- Reuse of treated wastewater (for green spaces)
- Improvement of water quality, e.g. water treatment

Domestic water supply:

- Water loss reduction
- Introduction of water saving technologies like low-flow toilets and showers

Agriculture

- Irrigation efficiency, e.g. through water saving technologies
- Introduction of new crop varieties (cash crops)
- (Micro) insurance solutions, e.g. for the case of crop shortfall
- Desalination of brackish water
- Reuse of treated wastewater
- Rainwater harvesting

Institutional adaptation activities include the following

- Increased water metering
- Reform of water pricing
- Promotion of water saving through awareness campaigns

==== Climate Justified Measures ====
Activities which directly target climate change mainly concern research activities.

- Support of meteorological monitoring system
- Regional and sectoral studies on vulnerability
- Investigation and prioritization of adaptation alternatives
- Early warning systems for upcoming droughts
- Education, awareness campaigns on climate change, its impacts and adaptation

=== Existing adaptation activities ===
The program “Adaptation to Climate Change to Sustain Jordan’s Millennium Development Goal Achievements” connects climate change adaptation with the MDGs. It is implemented jointly by UNDP, WHO, FAO and UNESCO and financed by the MDG Achievement Fund which is in turn financed by the Government of Spain (US$4 billion), SIWI and UNDP Jordan (about US$127,000). Besides the MoE, national key partners include the ministries of health, agriculture and education.

The program addresses challenges caused by climate-related water scarcity, including food security, health protection and access to improved water sources. The program has a rather institutional approach and a focus on stakeholder participation. Activities include training and capacity building, the development of an adequate policy and legal framework and public awareness campaigns. The Zarqa Governorate serves as a pilot area, in which the adaptive capacity of vulnerable communities is strengthened. The programme started in 2008 and was expected to end in 2010.

The program includes numerous no-regret activities like the upgrade of the national drinking water quality system. However, many activities directly target adaptation to climate change, for instance through the development of adaptation options.

Since climate change is expected to exacerbate existing water scarcity in Jordan, adaptation strategies have focused on increasing water supply and improving water-use efficiency. Measures such as waste water reuse and the desalination of brackish water have been identified as important components of Jordan's long-term water management strategy.

It has also been recommended that these activities be accompanied by measures that directly address climate change adaptation. Priority areas include strengthening meteorological and hydrological monitoring systems, improving climate vulnerability assessments, enhancing drought early warning systems, and reducing uncertainty in regional climate projections to support water resource planning and adaptation.

=== International cooperation ===
Jordan signed the United Nations Framework Convention on Climate Change (UNFCCC) in 1992 and ratified it in 1993. The main focal point for climate change issues in Jordan is the Ministry of Environment (MoE). With support of UNDP and the Global Environment Facility (GEF), it published Jordan's Second National Communication to the UNFCCC in 2009, relying on the knowledge of numerous Jordanian experts. Jordan issued a national climate change policy in 2013, led by the ministry of environment.

== See also ==
- Climate change in the Middle East and North Africa
- Water supply and sanitation in Jordan
- Renewable energy in Jordan
