= Omar Abdallah Dakhqan =

Jordanian politician

Omar Abdallah Dakhqan (Arabic: عمر عبد الله دخقان; died 19 November 2012) was a Jordanian politician. He served as Agriculture Minister in 1973. He also served as director general of the Hedjaz Jordan Railway and Jordan Phosphate Mines, as well as being chairman of the Jordan Valley Authority.
