= Al-Wehda Dam =

Al-Wehda Dam (Al-Wehda Dam)
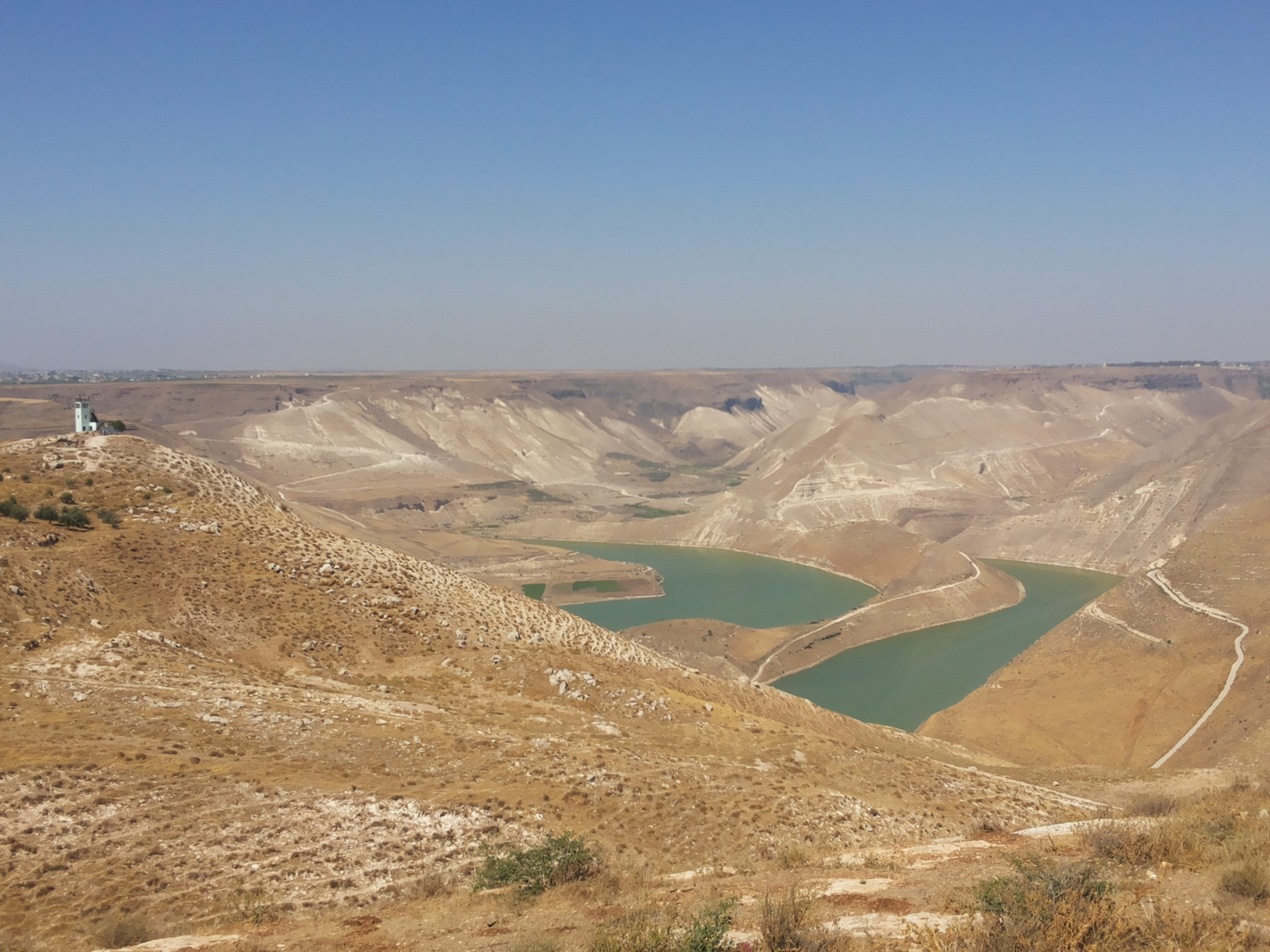
- Al-Wehda Dam in 2013

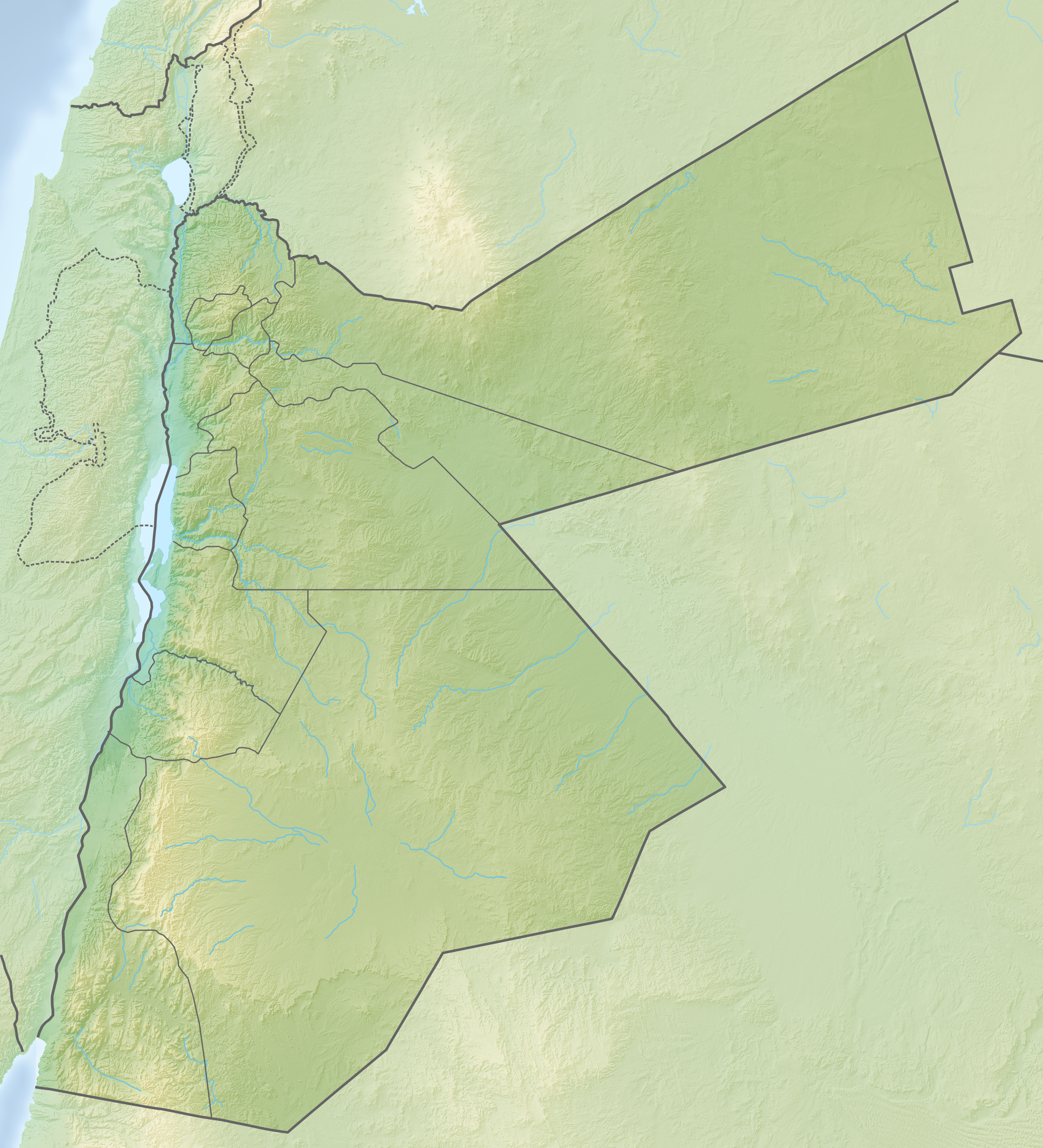
- Location within Jordan
- Location: Syria (controlled by Israel); Jordan
- Coordinates: 32°44′02″N 35°52′18″E
- Construction began: 2004
- Opening date: 2011

Dam and spillways
- Type of dam: Roller-compacted concrete
- Impounds: Yarmouk River
- Height: 110 m (360 ft)
- Length: 485 m (1,591 ft)
- Dam volume: 1,480,000 m^{3} (52,000,000 ft^{3})
- Spillway capacity: 8,000 m^{3}/s (280,000 cu ft/s)

Reservoir
- Total capacity: 115,000,000 m^{3} (93,000 acre⋅ft)

The Al-Wehda Dam (Arabic: سد الوحدة, romanized: Sadd Al-Weḥda, lit. 'Unity Dam'), formerly known as Maqarin Dam, is a 110 m (360 ft) roller-compacted concrete gravity dam on the Yarmouk River on the border between Syria and Jordan. It can hold up to 115,000,000 m^{3} (93,000 acre⋅ft) water and is designed to provide Jordan with water for both human consumption and agriculture. Water from the reservoir is diverted through a diversion weir at Addassiyah downstream of the Al-Wehda dam to the King Abdullah Canal where it is mixed with other freshwater sources. Some of the water from the canal is then pumped to Amman to be used as drinking water, after being treated in the Zai water treatment plant. The discharge of effluents from adjacent agricultural lands has caused algae growth and eutrophication especially in spring. Construction was funded by the Arab Fund for Economic and Social Development (80%), the Abu Dhabi Development Fund (10%) and the Government of Jordan (10%). In February 2004 King Abdullah II of Jordan and Syrian President Bashar al-Assad launched the construction of the dam. Turkey's Ozaltin Company constructed 60 per cent of the dam, while the remaining 40 per cent were carried out by Marwan Alkurdi Company and the National Company for Roads and Bridges.

The sharing of the waters of the Yarmouk River between the two countries is governed by a 1987 treaty that set up a Jordanian-Syrian Yarmouk River Basin Higher Committee. The agreement was renewed in 2001 when the design of the dam was modified, reducing the storage capacity from 480 to 115 million cubic meters, and removing a hydropower plant that had initially been foreseen from the plans. According to a statement made by the Jordanian Minister of Water and Irrigation, Mousa Jamani, in April 2012 Syria violates the water sharing agreement, because Syrian farmers downstream of the dam use more than the 6 million cubic meters per year that they are entitled to for irrigation along the riverbank. The Minister also said that "since the agreement was signed, the number of Syrian dams increased from 26 to 48, while around 3,500 wells were drilled to pump water from the river basin", thus decreasing the amount of water flowing into the dam's reservoir. Until the 1960s, the Yarmouk River’s flow used to reach 16 cubic meters per second, but has since dropped to only one cubic meter per second.

The Syrian banks of the Yarmuk on the border, as well as the Syrian half of the dam, were captured by the Israel Defense Forces on 17 December 2024 during their invasion into Syria. "Israel took control of the Al-Wahda Dam on the Yarmouk river reservoir near the town of Al-Qusayr in Syria’s Daraa Governorate on the border with the Kingdom of Jordan, which provides for approximately 30% of Syria’s fresh water supply, and 40% of the fresh water supply of Jordan", reported Israeli journalist Amir Tsarfati.
