= Jordan Valley Authority =

Jordanian government agency

The Jordan Valley Authority (JVA) is a government agency in Jordan tasked with carrying out socioeconomic development of Jordan's side of the Jordan Valley. The agency was established in 1977. It was a successor to the Jordanian Valley Authority, the Jordan River Tributaries Regional Cooperation and several other government departments related to the Jordan Valley. The JVA became responsible for water supply to Jordan's urban areas and agriculture. The JVA however did also play a role in land distribution as in the year of its founding a law established that all developed agricultural land could only be sold to the JVA.

== Maqarin dam ==
The JVA, under its president Omar Abdallah Dakhqan, was tasked in 1977 to seek a solution for North Jordan's water shortage. The affected area also included the capital, Amman. An earlier plan, to derive water from the King Talal Dam, was abandoned after there rose serious concerns for water quality safety. The JVA then proposed a plan for a dam on the Yarmouk River. The Maqarin dam as it was called was positioned however on the border between Syria and Jordan, and the river flow also effected Israel. Construction only began in 2004 and was finished in 2011.

== Deir Alla Agricultural Road ==
The Deir Alla Agricultural Road, Is part of the decentralization projects, aiming to improve infrastructures in the district. In September 2025, 90% of the road was completed, providing framers easier access to their fields. The project was funded by the 2024–2025 budget of the Balqa Governorate Council.
