= Raed Abu al-Soud =

Jordanian engineer and politician

- رائد أبو السعود

Minister of Transportation for Jordan
- In office October 25, 2003 – October 24, 2004
- Monarch: Abdullah II of Jordan
- Prime Minister: Faisal Al-Fayez

Minister of Public Works and Housing for Jordan
- In office October 25, 2003 – April 7, 2005
- Monarch: Abdullah II of Jordan
- Prime Minister: Faisal Al-Fayez; Adnan Badran

Minister of Water and Irrigation for Jordan
- In office April 7, 2005 – July 4, 2005
- In office November 25, 2007 – December 10, 2009
- In office October 11, 2018 – 7 March 2021
- Monarch: Abdullah II of Jordan
- Prime Minister: Adnan Badran; Nader Dahabi; Omar Razzaz; Bisher Al-Khasawneh; Jafar Hassan

Personal details
- Born: February 14, 1958 (age 68) Amman, Jordan
- Education: University of Miami; Harvard Kennedy School

Raed M. Abu al-Soud (Arabic: رائد أبو السعود, born February 14, 1958) is a Jordanian engineer and politician. He has held several key positions in a number of Jordanian Government Cabinets, with his first appointment being that of Jordanian Minister of Transportation between 2000 and 2003. He also served as Jordanian Minister of Public Works and Housing in two cabinets between 2003 and 2005, and held the position of Jordanian Minister of Water and Irrigation in 2005, between November 2007 and December 2009, once again between October 2018 and March 2021 and since 27 September 2023.

In 2010, he joined the board of directors of Nama'a/Consultus, a boutique consulting firm encompassing departments in Economic Development, Water, Energy and Environment, Health, Good Governance, and Human Resources serving the MENA region.

Abu al-Soud assumed office in 2018 during the first cabinet reshuffle of the Razzaz Government.

== Early life and education ==
Abu al-Soud was born in Amman, Jordan, on February 14, 1958. He attended the University of Miami, where he graduated with a Bachelors of Science in civil engineering and an MS in construction management from the University of Miami in 1982. He has also completed training through a number of courses he attended through the U.S. Agency for International Development and Harvard Kennedy School at Harvard University.

== Career ==
He has held several key positions in a number of Jordanian Government Cabinets, with his first appointment being that of Jordanian Minister of Transportation between 2000 and 2003. He also served as Jordanian Minister of Public Works and Housing in two cabinets between 2003 and 2005, and held the position of Jordanian Minister of Water and Irrigation in 2005, and once again between November 2007 and December 2009.

Serving as the Director of The Program Management Unit (PMU) at the Jordanian Ministry of Water and Irrigation during the period of 2000-2003, His Excellency was responsible for managing the PMU’s portfolio of projects, including the Greater Amman Water Sector Improvement Program, the Private Sector Participation Projects (PSP), in addition to other national water sector programs at a total value of US$400 million. He also played a leading role in finalizing negotiations on behalf of the Jordanian Government in July 2009 for the Disi water project, a $1 billion project which will pump 100 million cubic meters of water 320 km from Disi in the south, to the capital Amman. He also led negotiations on behalf of the Government for the Khirbet Assamra wastewater project, one of the three most advanced water treatment plants in the World. The project, which is the outcome of a joint USAID and private sector funding venture, was constructed to treat 250 cubic meters of wastewater per day. On May 9, 2005, Abu Soud signed an agreement with Israel and the Palestinian Authority to proceed with a feasibility study for the Two Seas Canal.

Prior to his ministerial tenure, he had an extensive career in construction, where he was directly involved in negotiating contract conditions, variation orders, claims with clients, consultants and sub-contractors with a number of Jordanian private sector companies between 1982 and 1985.

Abu al-Soud was also involved in several construction projects at the Royal Hashemite Court of Jordan between 1985 and 1990, which included the construction of governmental offices in Amman, an extension section at Al Nadwa Palace and the private offices of Queen Noor, in addition to construction tasks at Basman Palace and Aqaba Palace.

He has also held a number of positions overseas in Dubai as Production Manager with Cloisall Company, between 1992 and 1994, and as the Building Division Manager at Lilley International between 1994 and 1997.

== See also ==
Water supply and sanitation in Jordan

Two Seas Canal
