= King Talal Dam =

Dam in northern Jordan

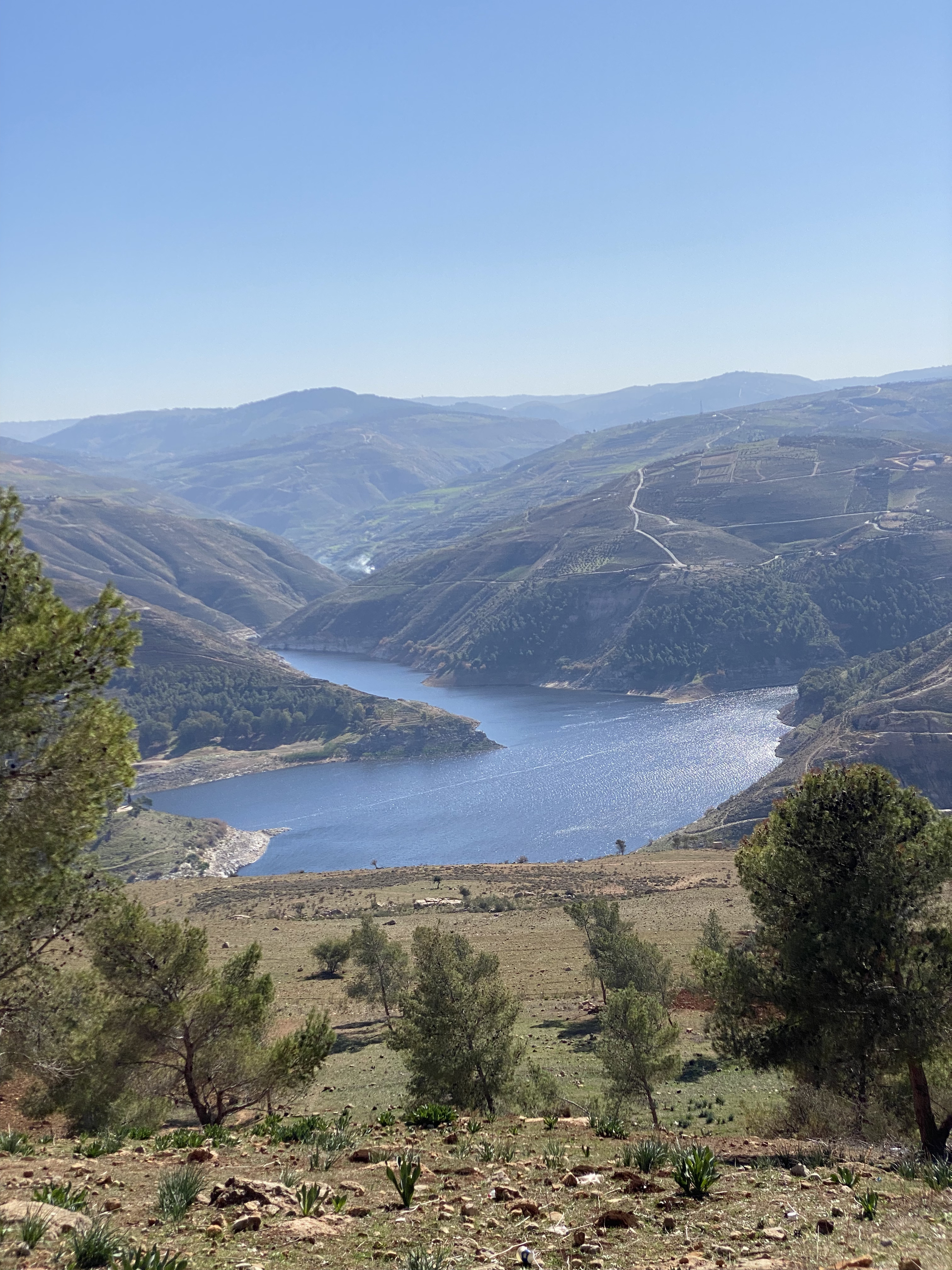
- King Talal Dam in 2023

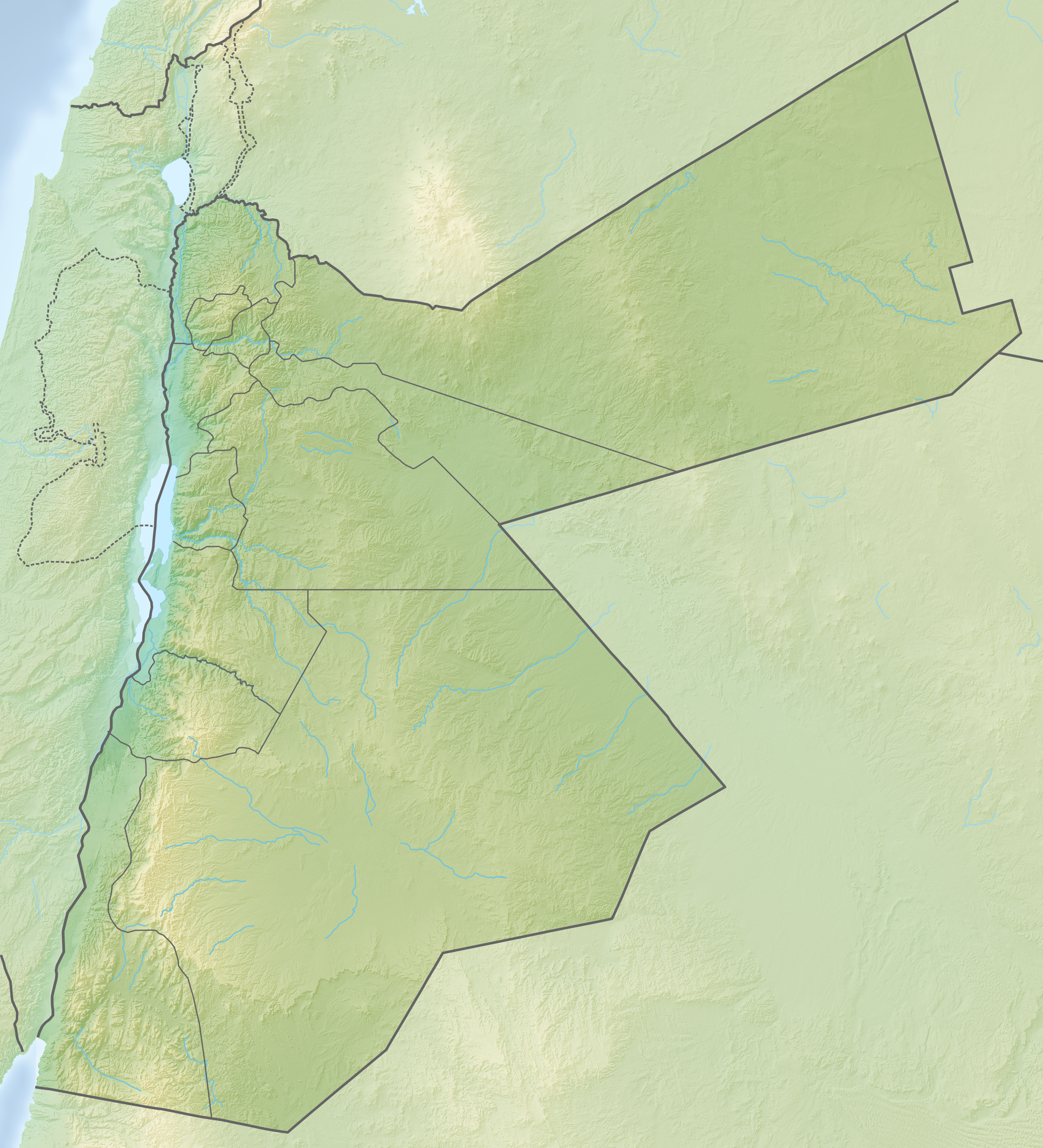
- Location within Jordan
- Country: Jordan
- Location: Jerash Governorate
- Coordinates: 32°11′24″N 35°48′05″E
- Status: Operational
- Construction began: 1972
- Opening date: 1978
- Owner: Jordan Valley Authority

Dam and spillways
- Type of dam: Earthfill
- Impounds: Zarqa River
- Height: 106 m (348 ft)

Reservoir
- Creates: King Talal Reservoir
- Total capacity: 86,000,000 m^{3} (69,721 acre⋅ft)
- Active capacity: 78,000,000 m^{3} (63,236 acre⋅ft)

Power Station
- Turbines: 2 x 2 MW Francis turbines
- Installed capacity: 4 MW

The King Talal Dam is a large dam in the hills of northern Jordan, across the Zarqa River. The dam was started in 1971, with the original construction being completed in 1978 at a height of 92.5 meters. The original dam cost $46 million and was partially funded by a $16.8 million loan from the Arab Fund for Economic and Social Development and a $5.6 million grant from the Abu Dhabi Fund. Energoprojekt of Yugoslavia was the consultant and Planum of Yugoslavia was the contractor.

In 1984, to meet the country's increased water demands, work to raise the dam to a height of 106 meters was begun, a project that was completed in 1988. The dam is named after king Talal of Jordan. The main purpose of the dam is to store winter rains and treated wastewater from Amman and Zarqa treated in the As Samra plant for irrigation in the Jordan Valley. The dam irrigates about 17,000 hectares and supports the livelihood of 120,000 people.
