= Yadin Kaufmann =

Israeli-American technology investor, social entrepreneur and writer

Yadin Kauffman
- Born: 31 July 1959 (age 67)
- Occupation: Businessman

Yadin B. Kaufmann (Hebrew: ידין קאופמן; born 31 July 1959) is an Israeli-American businessman.

Kaufmann co-founded two venture capital firms: Veritas Venture Partners, an Israel-based fund investing in early-stage tech startups, and Sadara Ventures, the first venture capital fund to target Palestinian tech companies. He also founded two non-profit organizations: Tmura, an Israeli fund that connects the high-tech community to philanthropy in Israel, and the Palestinian Internship Program, which arranges work opportunities for young Palestinian professionals at Israel-based tech and finance companies.

In 2017, Foreign Policy magazine named Kaufmann one of its “Global Thinkers”, a list of "the world's pre-eminent thought leaders and public intellectuals."

Since January 2019, Kaufmann has served as a member of the Board of Directors of the Anti-Defamation League.

== Venture capital ==
=== Israel ===
In 1987, Kaufmann joined Athena Venture Partners, Israel's first venture capital fund.

In 1990, Kaufmann co-founded Veritas Venture Partners, an early-stage investor in Israeli technology-based companies.

Athena and Veritas led seed-stage (and subsequent) financing rounds in Israeli companies including Mercury Interactive Corp. (Nasdaq: MERQ, later acquired by HP); Electronics for Imaging (Nasdaq: EFII), Gilat Satellite Networks (Nasdaq: GILT), Class Data Systems (acquired by Cisco), M-Systems (Nasdaq: MSYS, later acquired by SanDisk), ESC Medical Systems (Nasdaq: ESCMF, later acquired by Lumenis), and others.

=== Palestinian territories ===
In 2008, Kaufmann partnered with Palestinian tech entrepreneur Saed Nashef to build the first-ever venture capital fund to target Palestinian tech startups. They raised a $30 million fund from investors including the Soros Economic Development Fund, AOL founder Steve Case's Case Foundation, former eBay President Jeff Skoll's Skoll Foundation, Google Foundation, Cisco and the European Investment Bank and launched it as "Sadara Ventures" in 2011.

Sadara Ventures made Palestine's first-ever VC investment in Yamsafer, an online accommodation booking platform, in 2012, and went on to invest in five more startups in the Palestinian Territories.

US President Barack Obama referred to Kaufmann and Nashef's partnership in his March 2013 speech in Jerusalem.

== Non-profit ==
=== Tmura ===
In 2002, Kaufmann founded and he continues to serve as chairman of “Tmura - The Israeli Public Service Venture Fund.” Tmura receives donations of equity from Israeli and Israel-related high-tech companies and, upon a liquidity event such as an acquisition or initial public offering, allocates the proceeds to education- and youth-related charities in Israel.

As of June 2022, Tmura has received options donations from more than 800 companies and has raised over $28 million for the causes that it supports.

=== The Palestinian Internship Program ===
In 2014, Kaufmann founded and he continues to serve as chairman of the Palestinian Internship Program (PIP), a US-registered non-profit that arranges work experiences and other professional development activities for highly talented Palestinian graduates from the West Bank and East Jerusalem in the Israeli high-tech sector.

As of June 2022, PIP has enabled more than 90 young Palestinian professionals to work at 50 Israel-based companies, including Google, Intel, HP Indigo and Cisco, as well as several Israeli startups and venture funds.

In 2020, PIP launched The Palestinian Mentorship Program (PMP), which connects Palestinian business leaders and entrepreneurs with experienced talent in Israel, the US, Europe, and the Gulf. As of June 2022, PMP has connected 58 Palestinian businesspeople with Mentors.

In November 2024, Kaufmann commented in a CTech (Calcalist) investigative report on efforts to create a Palestinian tech hub in East Jerusalem, alongside Mahmoud Khweis of Jinnovate. He emphasized, “It’s very important for us here in Israel to help develop our neighbors’ economies and reduce the huge gaps that exist between the Palestinians and us in terms of wealth and opportunity.”

=== Breaking the Impasse ===
Kaufmann is a member of Breaking the Impasse (BTI), a World Economic Forum (WEF)-backed advocacy group of Palestinian and Israeli businesspeople (founded by Palestinian businessman Munib al-Masri and Israeli high-tech entrepreneur Yossi Vardi) lobbying political leaders to advance the Israeli-Palestinian peace process.

Kaufmann has spoken on behalf of BTI at WEF-sponsored events including at the group's launch event at the Dead Sea, Jordan in 2013 and at Davos, Switzerland in 2014.
