= Munib al-Masri =

Palestinian businessman

- منيب رشيد المصري
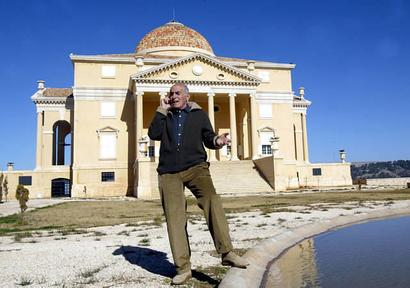
- Born: 1934 (age 91–92); Nablus, Mandatory Palestine
- Education: An-Najah National University; University of Texas at Austin
- Occupation: Businessman
- Spouse: Angela K. Masri
- Children: 6, including Mai Masri

Munib Rashid al-Masri (Arabic: منيب رشيد المصري), also known as the "Duke of Nablus", and "the Godfather" (born 1934), is a Palestinian industrialist, and patriarch of the al-Masri family.

Relatives include a cousin, Arab Bank and Paltel chairman Sabih al-Masri, and nephews, developer Bashar Masri, and Jordanian former prime minister Taher al-Masri.

One of Yasser Arafat's closest friends and supporters, al-Masri has served as a minister in the cabinet of Jordan, and has on multiple occasions declined both the presidency and the prime ministership of Palestine.

== Early life ==
Al-Masri was born in Nablus in 1934. He attended the an-Najah National University and graduated from the University of Texas in the United States. Al-Masri was shot and wounded by British soldiers in 1944.

Al-Masri made his fortune in the oil industry, then returned to the West Bank in the 1990s and founded a stock exchange in Nablus.

== Political life ==
Al-Masri was a close friend and confidant of Palestinian Liberation Organization leader Yasser Arafat. He repeatedly turned down offers to become Prime Minister of the Palestinian Authority.

In the 2000s, al-Masri founded the Muntada Forum, a Palestinian lobbying group aimed at promoting reform and dialogue among the warring Palestinian factions.

== Peace efforts ==
Al-Masri has stated that he has been working for the last 40 years to bring about a long lasting peace between Palestinians and Israelis. He would like to see an independent Palestine living in peace and harmony with Israel.

In May 2013, al-Masri and high-level Israeli high-tech entrepreneur Yossi Vardi unveiled the Breaking the Impasse (BTI) Initiative at the World Economic Forum held at the Dead Sea. At the launch, al-Masri stated, "It’s not for us to iron out the details. We are worried by the status quo. We want to change the status quo… Now the Israeli and Palestinian side [of the initiative] are very honest in their appeal: They want to break the impasse… They want the two sides to negotiate… to push all the parties to engage in real negotiations."

The BTI Forum was hosted by King Abdullah of Jordan and attended by John Kerry, Shimon Peres and Mahmoud Abbas. Breaking the Impasse initiatives goal is to encourage and support political leaders to work towards a two-state solution. al-Masri has stated that he will keep working towards achieving peace through the 2002 Arab Peace Initiative, which, like the Fez Initiative, offers Israel full recognition and normal relations with the Arabs in the context of comprehensive peace.

== Personal ==
He is married to Angela Masri and they have four sons, Rabih, Mazen, Omar and Leith, and two daughters Mai Masri and Dina. Al-Masri is the cousin of Sabih al-Masri, one of Jordan's most prominent businessmen and the founder of the Palestine Securities Exchange.

=== Wealth ===
An Israeli newspaper once called al-Masri the "Palestinian Rothschild".

Between 1998 and 2000 he built a 70-acre estate with a palace that overlooks the city of Nablus, which he named Beit Falasteen or "House of Palestine", inspired by Andrea Palladio's 17th century Villa La Rotonda. Scholar Ghada Karmi described this as a "zealous" investment, "meant to defy the Jewish settlements encroaching on this city." She noted that the palace was "built commandingly" on a hilltop, mirroring the Israeli settlements that were attempting to gain control of the land by occupying strategic locations.
