= List of banks in Jordan =

The following is the list of banks in Jordan.

Bank Name	Type	Chairman	General Manager/CEO	Website
Arab Bank	Commercial	Sabih Taher Darwish Al-Masri	Randa Al-Sadiq	arabbank.com.jo
Bank ABC (Jordan)	Commercial	Sael Fayes Izzat Alwaary	George Sofia	www.bank-abc.com
Bank of Jordan	Commercial	Shaker Tawfiq Fakhouri	Saleh Rajab Hammad	bankofjordan.com
Cairo Amman Bank	Commercial	Yazid Adnan Mustafa Almufti	Kamal Al - Bakri	cab.jo
Capital Bank of Jordan	Commercial	Bassem Khalil Alsalem	Dawod Al Ghoul	capitalbank.jo
Central Bank of Jordan	Central	Adel Al-Sharkas		cbj.gov.jo
Jordan Commercial Bank	Commercial	Michael Al-Sayegh	Caesar Hani Aziz Qulajen	jcbank.com.jo
Jordan Kuwait Bank	Commercial	Nasser A. Lozi	Haethum Buttikhi	https://www.jkb.com/
Jordan Ahli Bank	Commercial	Saad Nabil Yousef Mouasher	Ahmad Awd Alhussein	ahli.com
Housing Bank for Trade & Finance	Commercial	Abdel Elah Al-Khatib	Ammar Al-Safadi	hbtf.com
Arab Jordan Investment Bank	Commercial	Hani Abdulkadir Al-Qadi	Nasser Al-Tarawneh	ajib.com
INVESTBANK	Commercial	Fahmi F. AbuKhadra	Muntaser Dawwas	investbank.jo
Société Générale de Banque Jordanie	Commercial	NA	NA	NA
Bank al Etihad	Commercial	Isam Salfiti	Nadia Al Saeed	bankaletihad.com
Islamic International Arab Bank	Islamic (Jordanian)	"Mohammed Said" Mohammed Shahin	Iyad Ghasoub Asali	iiabank.com.jo
Jordan Islamic Bank	Islamic (Jordanian)	Musa Abdel-Aziz Shihadeh	Hussein Said Mohammad “ Ammar Saifan”	jordanislamicbank.com
Safwa Islamic Bank	Islamic (Jordanian)	Moh'd Naser Salem Abu-Hammour	Samer Al-Tamimi	safwabank.com
Standard Chartered	Foreign			standardchartered.com
Egyptian Arab Land Bank	Foreign		Tarek Akel	https://aqaribank.jo
Citibank	Foreign		Nour Jarrar	citibank.com/jordan
Rafidain Bank	Foreign		Sameerah Swadi Hussein	rafidain-bank.gov.iq
National Bank of Kuwait	Foreign		Ihab Al-Aqqad	nbk.com
BLOM Bank	Foreign		Dr. Adnan Al- A’raj	blombank.com
Bank Audi	Foreign		Yousef Ali Ensour	banqueaudi.com/jordan
Al-Rajhi Bank	Islamic (foreign)		Eyad Jarrar	https://www.alrajhibank.com.jo/
Blink	Digital		Zein Malhas	https://theblink.com/en
Reflect	Digital			reflectapp.com
ila	Digital			https://ilabank.com/jo

== Mobile payment ==
Orange Money	Zain Cash	UWALLET	Dinarak	Alawnehpay	National Wallet	Gadha (Gate To Pay)	URPay	CLIQ

== See also ==
- List of banks in the Arab world
