= 2003 Route 60 vehicle shooting =

Hamas attack

2003 Route 60 Hamas ambush
- Location: Route 60, West Bank
- Date: 20 June 2003
- Deaths: Tzvi Howard Goldstein
- Injuries: 3 members of Goldstein family
- Perpetrator: Hamas

On 20 June 2003, Howard Tzvi Goldstein was driving his parents, Eugene and Lorraine Goldstein and his wife, Michal (Honickman) from Eli to Jerusalem, after his son David’s wedding. Jerusalem. Near the Yabroud underpass two Hamas members waiting in ambush on the roadside opened fire with AK-47s, hitting all four occupants. Howard was severely injured so Eugene, who was sitting in the front seat, took the steering wheel and drove the car away from the gunmen and for a further eight miles in search of help before the car flipped over.

Eugene suffered multiple gunshot wounds: his lungs were perforated, his shoulder blade was broken and shell fragments were embedded in his lung, liver and kidneys. A bullet was lodged between his heart and his lungs. Lorraine was shot multiple times and was severely injured by a bullet that cut her nose and her left upper lip requiring intubation and emergency surgery, Her chewing muscles were permanently damaged. Michal was injured by glass in her left eye, with hairline fractures of her ribs, bruising, and physical trauma when the vehicle eventually crashed and rolled over.

Howard Tzvi died of his injuries. His family survived, with varying degrees of injury, after being taken to Hadassah Medical Center.

The attack occurred on the day that Israeli troops withdrew from Northern Gaza, hailed by Secretary of State Colin Powell, who was visiting Jerusalem, as a significant development.

== Responsibility ==
Hamas immediately claimed responsibility for the shooting attack. This claim, was described by the Haaretz newspaper as "surprising," since, according to writer Amos Harel, before the attack, the "militant Islamic organization" (Hamas) has almost completely avoided carrying out shootings in the West Bank, focusing instead on using suicide bombers, primarily within the Green Line.

== Immediate impact ==
The attack was also described as disruptive to the Road map for peace, an initiative involving United States Secretary of State Colin Powell, visiting Jerusalem at the time. Under the roadmap the Israelis were to release prisoners and hand over territories, which the Palestinian side were to assume responsibility for, including making sure that no terrorist activity would be conducted against Israelis. According to Ian Fisher of The New York Times, the attack was interpreted "as a message to Mr. Powell, the Israelis and its Palestinian supporters that Hamas remains strong and very much active."

On 21 June, the Israel Defense Forces killed Abdullah Qawasmeh, who was believed to be the senior Hamas commander in the Hebron area.

== Lawsuits ==
In 2004 Lorraine and Eugene Goldstein, who live in Plainview, New York, sued the Arab Bank for laundering money used to fund Hamas terror attacks targeting Israelis, including the attack in which their son, Howard, was killed and they were injured.

In 2006, the Goldsteins joined a group of 50 American victims of terrorism (survivors or relatives of people murdered by terrorists), from 13 separate terrorist incidents by Hamas suing three large international banks, Crédit Lyonnais, Arab Bank, and NatWest, alleging that all three banks were involved in channeling money to Hamas which has been listed by the government of the United States as a terrorist organization since 1997. The Anti-Terrorism Act enables American victims of acts of terrorism that take place outside the United States can sue for damages in federal courts.

The thirteen incidents included: 1. Jerusalem bus attack on August 19, 2003 2. Route 60 attack on June 20, 2003 in which Goldstein was killed. 3. Egged bus #14A on June 11, 2003 4. Commuter bus to Jerusalem on May 18, 2003 5. Mike's Place, a Tel Aviv restaurant on April 30, 20036. Route 60 on January 29, 2003 7. Frank Sinatra cafeteria at Hebrew University's Mount Scopus campus on July 31, 2002 8. Open air market in Netanya on May 19, 2002; 9. Sheffield social club and gaming parlor in Rishon Lezion on May 7, 2002;10. Park Hotel in Netanya during Passover Seder on March 27, 2002; 11. Pedestrian Mall in Jerusalem on December 1, 2001;12. Sbarro's Pizzeria in Jerusalem on August 19, 2001;13. Neve Yamin gas station bombing near Kfar Sava on March 28, 2001.

In August 2015, Arab Bank agreed to a confidential settlement with hundreds of American victims of terrorism, including the Goldsteins.

In 2019 the Goldsteins joined victims and their family members from Hamas perpetrated terrorist acts between 2001 and 2003 in suing Lebanese Blom Bank in Second Circuit Court for aiding and abetting Hamas activities by facilitating funds. The terrorist incidents which were part of the lawsuit were: the Shooting Attack on Route #60 – June 20, 2003, in which Howard/Tzvi Goldstein was killed; Jerusalem Egged Bus #2 bombing – August 19, 2003 in which Tehilla Nathansen, aged 3 was killed while sitting on her mother’s lap; Jaffa Road Bus #14A bombing – June 11, 2003 in which twenty-three people were killed and over 130 were injured; commuter bus #6 bombing – MAY 18, 2003 in which seven people were killed and 20 others were injured; Mike's Place bombing in Tel Aviv – April 30, 2003 killing three people and injuring over 50; the shooting attack on Route #60 – January 29, 2003 seriously injuring one person; Hebrew University Cafeteria bombing – July 31, 2002 killing nine people and injuring 70; Sheffield Club bombing – May 7, 2002 killing fifteen people and injuring more than 50; the Passover Massacre at the Park Hotel in Netanya - March 27, 2002 in which 30 people were killed and 140 injured; Patt Junction bus # 32A bombing – JUNE 18, 2002 Nineteen people were killed, and 74 were injured; Ariel bombing – October 27, 2002 killing three Israeli soldiers and injuring 15 other people; the Ben Yehuda Street bombings – December 1, 2001 in which eleven people were killed, and 188 were injured.

In 2024 this case was brought before the US Supreme Court which ruled that the Second Circuit had erred in its judgement.
