= Adam Wa Mishmish =

Arabic educational cartoon

Adam Wa Mishmish (Arabic: آدم ومشمش) is an Arabic-language educational cartoon created in 2016. Initially published on YouTube, the series teaches literacy in Arabic, numeracy, and the elements of musical instruments such as the ney.

== History ==
The program was founded by Luma Al Adnani in an effort to teach her son Adam the Arabic language. The other co-founders are Lina Al Adnani, COO & Music Lead, Ibrahim Taha, the music manager and Lutfi Zayed, the creative director. In April 2016, Adam Wa Mishmish was created on the video sharing website YouTube to provide free educational entertainment to children who wanted to learn Arabic across the world.

In its early stages, Adam Wa Mishmish was self-funded. Later, seven episodes were funded through the Jordanian crowdfunding site Afkarmena.com. Following the release of the first season of Adam Wa Mishmish on YouTube, the startup received funding from the Abdul Hameed Shoman Foundation, which helped produce the first 80 episodes, a play and a book series. In 2021, the startup raised $475,000 in a seed funding round led by Hadi Badi a Saudi Arabia-based news and review site.

Adam wa Mishmish specialize in creating fun Arabic resources to make learning Arabic fun and educational. That includes music, animation, books and interactive live musical plays.
