= Arab Tunisian Bank =

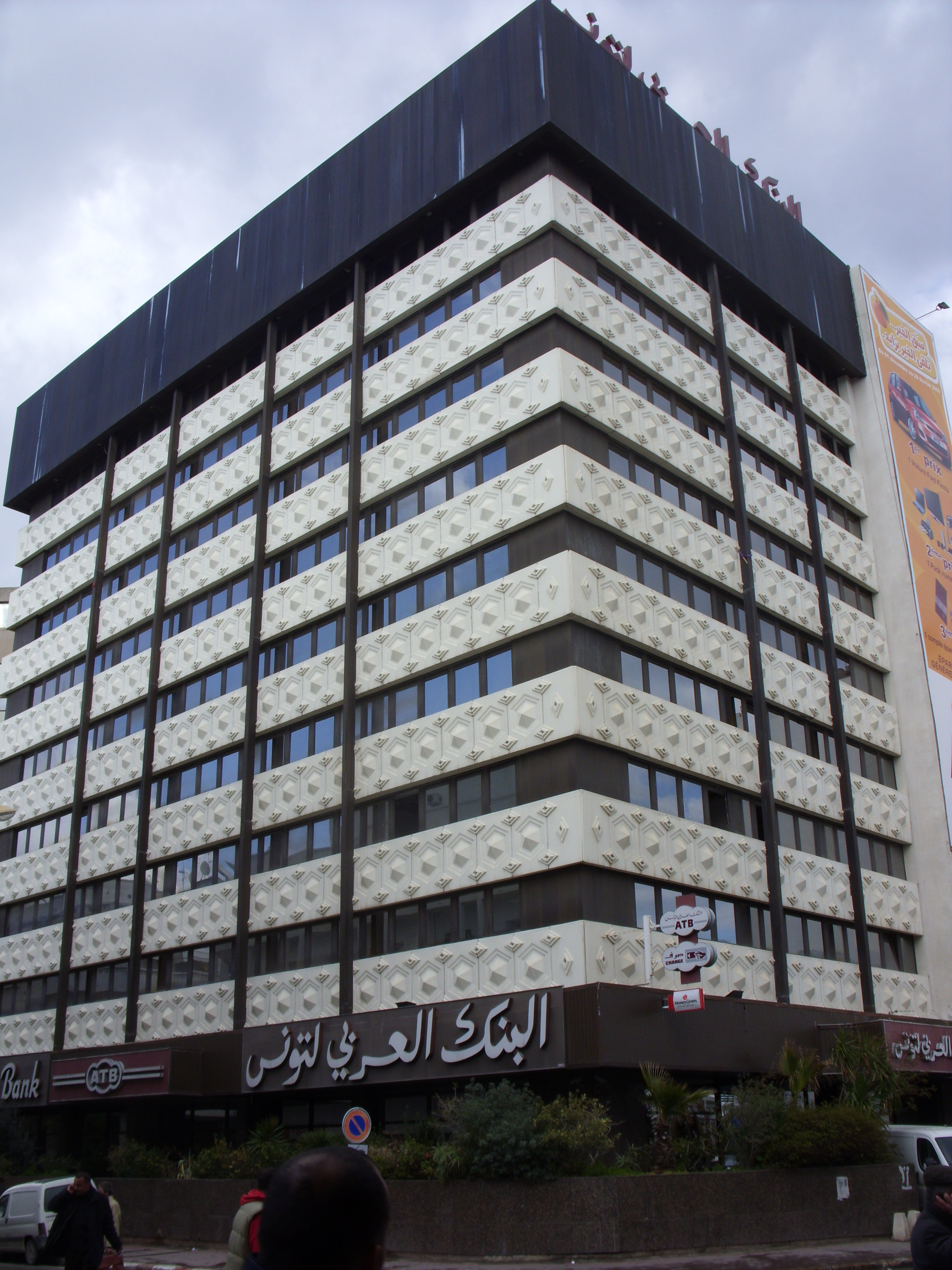
- Bank headquarters in downtown Tunis
- Company type: Private bank
- Traded as: BVMT: ATB
- ISIN: TN0003600350
- Industry: Banking
- Founded: 1982; 44 years ago
- Headquarters: Tunis, Tunisia
- Number of locations: 108 (2025)
- Key people: Randa Sadik (Chairman); Ahmed Rejiba (CEO)
- Revenue: USD 3,4 million (2025)
- Operating income: USD 117 million (2025)
- Total assets: USD 2,84 billion (2025)
- Total equity: USD 232 million (2025)
- Number of employees: 1628 (2025)
- Parent: Arab Bank (64.24%)
- Website: www.atb.tn

Arab Tunisian Bank (ATB) (Arabic: البنك العربي لتونس), a Tunisian commercial bank, was created on June 30, 1982, by the integration of a branch of the Arab Bank Tunis with Tunisian individuals. Its mission was contribution to the economic and financial development of the country.

== History ==
Tunisia's first president, Habib Bourguiba, was helped by Abdul Hameed Shoman, the founder of the Arab Bank Group, in his combat against French colonization. In 1952, Bourguiba permitted Shoman to open an Arab bank branch in Tunisia, as Arab Bank-Tunis. In 1982, Arab Bank changed its name to Arab Tunisian Bank.

In 2008, the General Assembly decided to grow the bank's capital from 60 million dinars to 100 million dinars within two years. They increased the capital of the bank to 80 million dinars in 2008 as a first step.

== See also ==
- List of banks in Tunisia
