= Arab Bank Iraq =

Bank of Iraq

- Native name: البنك العربي في العراق
- Type: Subsidiary
- Industry: Financial services
- Founded: 1945 and 2023
- Headquarters: Baghdad, Iraq
- Number of locations: 2 (2025)
- Area served: Iraq
- Key people: Basil Al Dhahi (CEO)
- Revenue: IQD 26 billion (2025) (USD 19,9 million)
- Total assets: IQD 493 billion (2025) (USD 376 million)
- Total equity: IQD 226 billion (2025) (USD 173 million)
- Number of employees: 138 (2025)
- Parent: Arab Bank
- Website: www.arabbankiraq.com

The Arab Bank Iraq (Arabic: البنك العربي في العراق) is a small-sized Iraqi bank. Subsidiary of the Jordanian group Arab Bank.

== History ==
Arab Bank opened its first Iraqi branch in Baghdad in 1945, establishing branches in Erbil and Mosul. The bank’s first period in Iraq came to a sudden halt in 1964. Following a political wave of Arab socialism in the middle east, the Iraqi government passed sweeping nationalization laws.

In 2023, Arab Bank re-entered the market by establishing a new entity, Arab Bank Iraq, structured as a private Iraqi joint-stock company. Arab National Bank announced an investment of USD 38.2 million in newly created bank obtaining 20% of the shareholding.

== Shareholders ==
As of 2025.

- Arab Bank 60%
- Arab National Bank 20%
- Isnad 10%

== See also ==
- List of banks in Iraq
