= Bashar Masri =

Palestinian entrepreneur and businessman (born 1961)

Bashar Al Masri
- بشار المصري
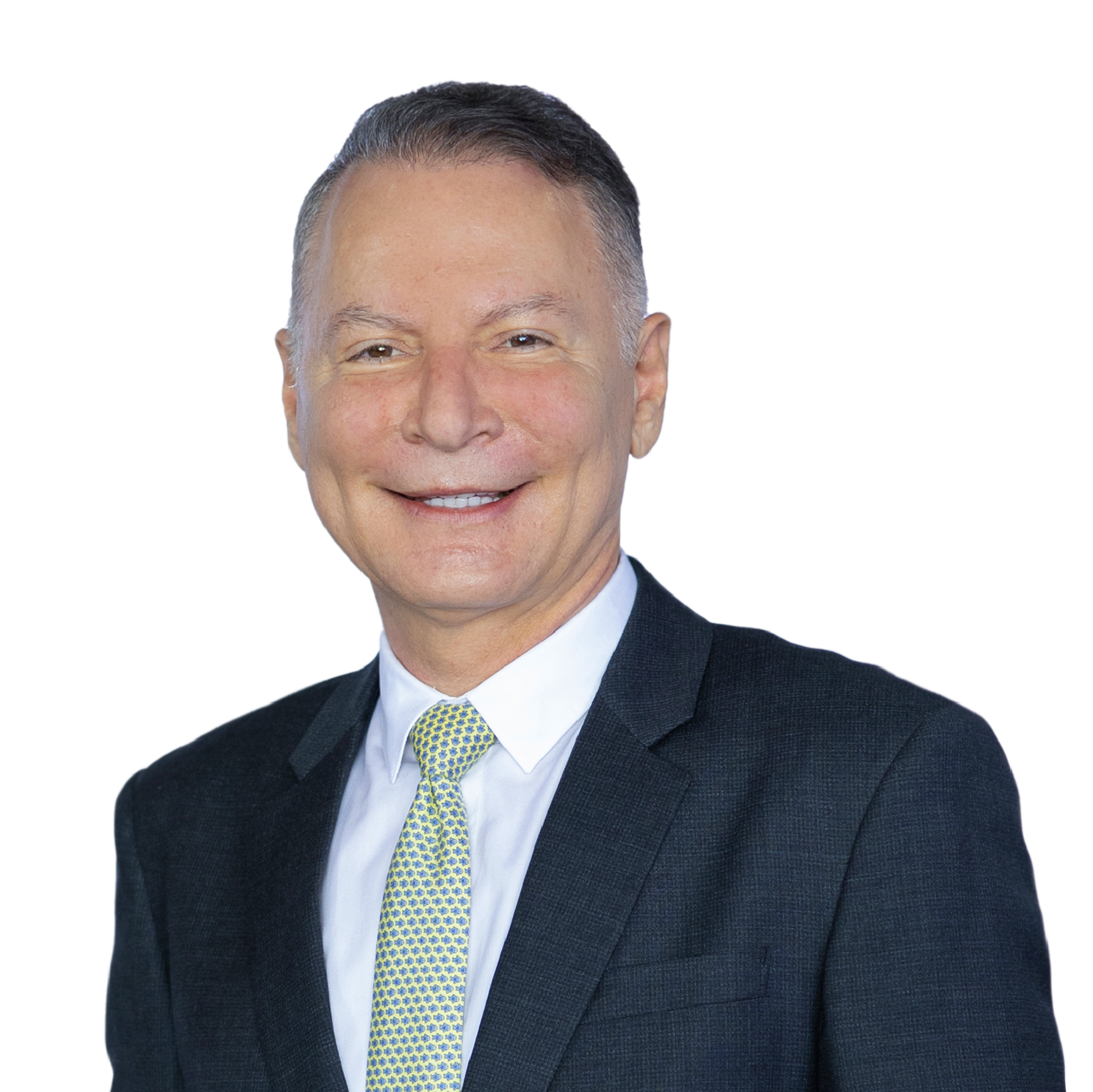
- Born: Bashar Al Masri; 3 February 1961 (age 65); Nablus, Jordanian-administered West Bank, Palestine (present-day Nablus, Palestine)
- Education: Virginia Polytechnic Institute and State University
- Occupation: Businessman
- Spouse: Jean
- Children: 2
- Relatives: Munib al-Masri (uncle); Sabih al-Masri (great-uncle)
- Website: www.basharmasri.com

Bashar Al Masri (Arabic: بشار المصري, romanized: Bashshār al-Miṣrī; born 3 February 1961), known in the West as Bashar Masri, is a Palestinian and American dual citizen and a businessman who is the founder and chairman of Massar International since its establishment in 1994. He is the founder of Rawabi, the West Bank's first planned city, and the founder and the CEO of Bayti Real Estate Investment Company that built the city. He founded and manages the first Palestinian equity fund, a $90 million investment initiative known as "Siraj Fund". He is on the list of the "Top Ten Richest People of Palestine in 2016." Masri was named by the World Economic Forum as a Global Leader of Tomorrow and ranked among the World's 50 Greatest Leaders in 2018 by Fortune magazine.

Masri is chairman of the Palestine Development and Investment Company

== Early life ==
Masri was born in Nablus, then under Jordanian rule. At 14 years old, Masri began throwing stones and organizing demonstrations, leading him to be jailed by Israel eight times. At age 16, Masri’s father sent him to school in Egypt after he was released from prison and missed exams. After leaving Nablus, Masri continued his education in Egypt, before moving to the United States, where he graduated from Virginia Tech (Virginia Polytechnic Institute and State University) with a B.S. in chemical engineering in 1983.

After participating in the First Intifada, Masri went back to the United States, where he had already attended college, married an American and received US citizenship.

== Career ==
Masri worked in a number of countries, including Saudi Arabia, the United States and the United Kingdom, before he decided to return to Palestine and settle there in the mid-1994. He has a background in management consulting and industrial management.

On a regional level, Masri has spearheaded large and economically significant investment projects, including affordable housing communities in Morocco, commercial and residential developments in Jordan, and a residential real estate project in Egypt. Massar International under Masri's management currently has multiple businesses in Morocco, Jordan, Egypt and Serbia.

== Business in Palestine ==
=== Al-Ayyam Newspaper ===
After Masri came back from Washington, DC to Palestine in the mid-1990s to establish himself in his home country, he started by founding Palestinian daily newspaper Al-Ayyam (Arabic: جريدة الأيام) and was its publisher. Al Ayyam is today the second largest newspaper in Palestine.

=== Massar International Ltd ===
In 1994, Masri founded Massar International. As the chairman of the board since the establishment of Massar, he has been one of the most prominent figures promoting private sector development and growth in Palestine. He has dedicated his life to establishing, investing, transforming, networking, training and building what is now a widely known group of businesses bridging Palestine to global technologies, knowledge, know-how and industry best practices. In the past decade, he has launched businesses in financial services, real estate, media and communications, retail businesses, agribusiness and information technology.

=== Rawabi City & Bayti Real Estate ===
Masri is the visionary and founder of Rawabi City, and oversees the construction and development of the city. Rawabi City is a high-tech planned city, the first of its kind in Palestine, and it was funded fully by the private sector, Rawabi is considered the largest private sector investment in Palestine's history. The construction of the city so far has cost 1.4 billion dollars. Rawabi is being constructed by Bayti Real Estate Investment Company that is jointly owned by Qatari Diar Real Estate Investment Company and Massar International. With its more than 6,000 housing units built to serve families from multiple demographics, state-of-the-art infrastructure, and an emerging commercial hub, the city has already made a positive economic and social impact on Palestinians and it is constructed to provide housing for 25,000 person in its first stage and 40,000 people when it is done. Not only does the city provide affordable housing options it is also the second biggest generator of jobs, after the Palestinian Government, providing between 8,000 and 10,000 job opportunity a year for construction workers. In order to build Rawabi, Masri cooperated with Israeli businesses and government officials, leading him to be criticized by Boycott, Divestment and Sanctions. Israeli companies that work on Rawabi’s development have signed a contract against using Israeli settlement products, which upset right-wing Israeli legislators. The city has received support from American Jewish groups, such as AIPAC and the Anti-Defamation League.

Masri aims for the City of Rawabi to be the Silicon Valley and the Tech Hub for the State of Palestine.

In July 2022, Apple Inc. announced that the company would be expanding their research and development centre in Rawabi. The expansion will take place via hiring contractor ASAL Technologies and Masri in order to achieve the expansion.

=== Siraj Fund Management Company ===
Masri founded and manages the first Palestinian equity fund, a 90 million investment initiative known as "Siraj Fund" in 2003, and the company's first fund "Siraj Palestine Fund I" was launched in February 2011, the company was founded for the sole purpose of managing investment funds in Palestine. The company focuses on promising startups and capital investments in small and medium-sized enterprises in the sectors of information and communication technology services, energy, agriculture, clean technology, healthcare, logistics, education, manufacturing, transportation, construction and financial services. Siraj's investments in these companies range between $250,000 and $12 million, and plans on expanding in the MENA region in the future.

=== Alleged ties to Hamas ===
In April 2025, around 200 victims of the October 7 attacks and their family members sued three of Masri's real estate businesses for allegedly developing and operating properties that masked Hamas tunnels. The lawsuit alleges that Masri was aware of Hamas infrastructure on his properties. Masri resigned from his position at Harvard University following the lawsuit's filing. In August 2025, the plaintiffs' lawyers reported that they were unable to locate Masri to serve him a legal summons, and that he was probably residing somewhere in the Palestinian territories.

== Political views ==
In an interview to Business Insider, Masri said that BDS boycotts against the entire State of Israel are a mistake, and instead "It would have been a great tactic" to boycott the Israeli settlements only.

After Israel's normalization deal with the United Arab Emirates and Bahrain, Masri said Palestinians should try to turn it into "a positive thing for us", adding he hopes that those countries would "pressure Israel into concessions for the Palestinians".

In a conference organized by the Israeli economic newspaper Globes, Masri said of the Israeli military occupation "There is no good occupation, and being occupied is terrible, regardless of who the occupier is. For the occupiers, being an occupier is bad", and added that he's also critical of the Palestinian leadership, saying "They are using excuses and can do a lot more, but the situation is different because of the occupation".

== Diplomatic involvement ==
Per the Israeli journalist Ben Caspit, in an article published in The Jerusalem Post and Maariv, in 2025 Masri has been acting as a "close" advisor to Adam Boehler, the Trump administration Special Presidential Envoy for Hostage Affairs. According to Caspit, Masri is viewed as "a pragmatic figure" who does not have any ties to the Palestinian Authority or to Hamas, and is in a uniquely influential position being respected by both the American administration and Palestinian business circles.

An article in Haaretz claimed that a private jet once used by Yasser Arafat and now owned by Masri was used, per Caspit's report, by Boehler to shuttle between countries throughout the Middle East.

== Personal life ==
Bashar Al-Masri is married to Jean, a Christian American woman, whom he met while studying at Virginia Tech. They have two daughters. He is part of the al Masri family, a prominent Nablus family, whose members served as ministers in the Jordanian and Palestinian governments. Israeli news outlet Ynet reported the al Masri family are politically unaffiliated, refraining from political involvement in order to avoid "jeopardizing their extensive business ventures".

Masri is the nephew of the Palestinian businessman Munib al-Masri (b. 1934), once dubbed by the economic daily Globes "The only multi-millionaire in Palestine", who called himself Yasser Arafat's "best friend". Masri was present when Arafat attended the Oslo Accords.

Masri's great uncle is Sabih al-Masri, a prominent Jordanian-Palestinian businessman.

== Awards and positions ==
Masri is the former Palestinian Chapter Chairman of the Young Presidents' Organization (YPO). He was named as a "Global Leader of Tomorrow" by the World Economic Forum. Masri is on the board of trustees of An-Najah National University. In April 2025, Masri stepped down as a member of the Deans' Council of the John F. Kennedy School of Government at Harvard University amid allegations of Hamas connections.

In 2018, Fortune Magazine ranked Masri #38 on its list of "The World's 50 Greatest Leaders".
