= Breaking the Impasse =

Israeli-Palestinian advocacy group

Breaking the Impasse (BTI) is an advocacy group consisting of Israeli and Palestinian business leaders. BTI's aim is to urge the Israeli government and Palestinian Authority leadership to reach a peace agreement based on the two-state solution.

BTI was launched in 2013 under the auspices of the World Economic Forum. The leading members of the group are Palestinian businessman Munib al-Masri and Israeli high-tech entrepreneur Yossi Vardi.

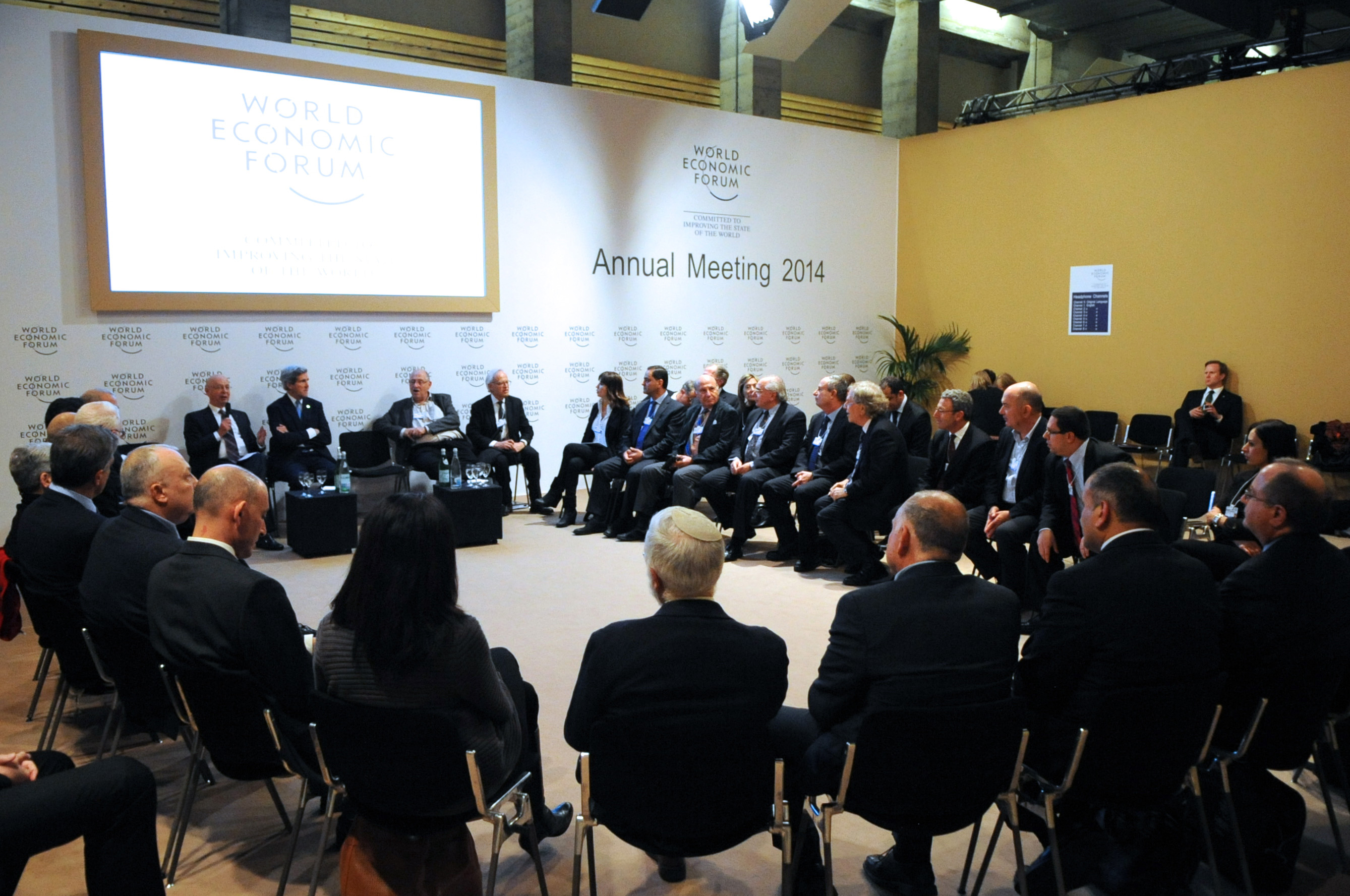
U.S. Secretary of State John Kerry sits down with BTI members on the sidelines of the World Economic Forum in Davos, Switzerland, on January 24, 2014.

BTI has been backed by over 300 Israeli and Palestinian business figures. Of the group's members, around 120 are Palestinians from the West Bank or Jerusalem.

== History ==
The idea of forming a pressure group led by Israeli and Palestinian business figures was conceived at a meeting of the World Economic Forum in Davos, Switzerland in June 2012. The group was intended to be apolitical and not endorse a specific political party or approach to ending the Israel-Palestine conflict. The initiator on the Israeli side was Yossi Vardi, considered a founding father of the Israeli high tech industry.

The group of approximately 300 Israeli and Palestinian businessmen met monthly in Tel Aviv, with the 120 Palestinians in the group coming from the West Bank and Jerusalem. According to Israeli businessman Dan Soffer of VeriFone, BTI's 300 members controlled more than a fifth of the GDP in Israel and the Palestinian territories, and the Israeli members came from some of Israel's biggest companies.

Breaking the Impasse publicly launched with a press conference in the Dead Sea on 26 May 2013. The press conference panel consisted of: Munib al-Masri, Yossi Vardi, Palestinian businessman Samir Huleileh (CEO of Padico Holdings) and Riad Kamal (then Vice-Chairman, Arabtec Holding), Israeli venture capitalist Yadin Kaufmann (Founding Partner, Sadara Ventures), and was chaired by Adrian Monck of the World Economic Forum.

At the launch, Vardi stated:

“We saw 300 of the most influential people...[who] stood tall, and said ‘enough is enough'. This alone sent a clear and distinct tone to the politicians, and I think they will take it into consideration. Maybe we’ll fail… I don’t think that we will fail, but at least we will say that we tried as hard as we could.”

Al-Masri stated:

“It’s not for us to iron out the details. We are worried by the status quo. We want to change the status quo… Now the Israeli and Palestinian side [of the initiative] are very honest in their appeal: They want to break the impasse… They want the two sides to negotiate… to push all the parties to engage in real negotiations.”

In January 2014, BTI sponsored a 10-day media campaign in Israel costing around $286,000 that included advertisements and public billboards supporting direct negotiations and calling to preserve Israel's character as Jewish and democratic. In the aftermath of the 2014 Fatah–Hamas Agreements and the stalling of direct negotiations between Israel and Palestine, the group paused its efforts.

== Members ==
=== Palestinian ===
Among the Palestinian supporters of BTI are:

- Munib al-Masri, Chairman, Edgo Group and Padico Holdings and confidant of Yasser Arafat
- Samir Huleileh (CEO, Padico Holdings)
- Riad Kamal (then Vice-Chairman, Arabtec Holding)
- Rafiq Masri (founder and president, Network Management, Inc.)
- Riman Barakat (founder & CEO, Experience Palestine)

=== Israeli ===
Among the Israeli supporters of BTI are:

- Yossi Vardi, tech entrepreneur and investor
- Yadin Kaufmann (founder, Sadara Ventures and Veritas Ventures)
- Edouard Cukierman (founder, Catalyst Funds)
- Ofra Strauss (chairwoman, Strauss Group)
- Gad Propper (former director and CEO, Osem Investments)
- Yehuda and Yehudit Bronicki (controlling shareholders, Ormat Industries Ltd.)
- Yoram Yaacovi (then general manager, Microsoft Israel)
- Rami Levy, founder and CEO, Rami Levy Hashikma Marketing
- Eyal Waldman, cofounder, Mellanox Technologies
- Gad Propper, CEO of food giant Osem International

== Reactions ==
Haifa University professor Daniel Gutwein questioned whether the group of businessmen would be able to move the parties toward a two-state solution.
