= Xavi Bou =

Catalan photographer

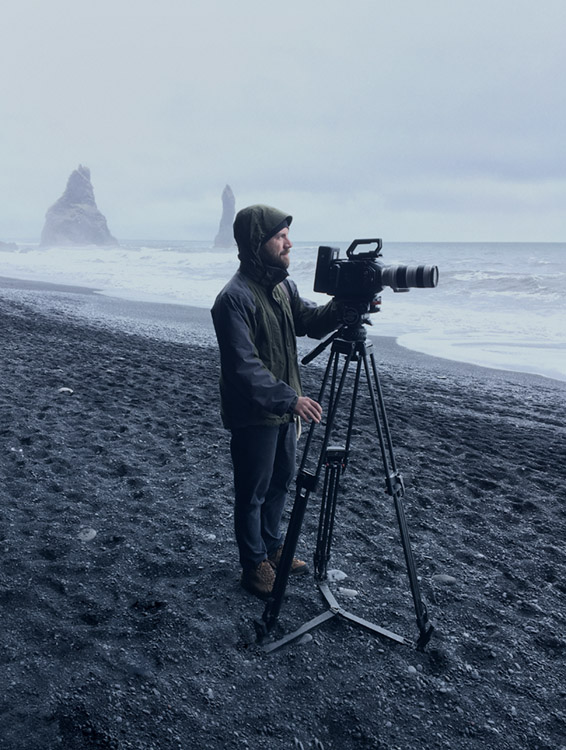
- Born: 1979 (age 46–47); Barcelona, Spain
- Occupation: Photographer
- Known for: Photographing birds and insects in flight
- Website: https://xavibou.com/

Xavi Bou (born 1979) is a Spanish photographer whose work makes visible the flight paths of birds.

== Biography ==
Xavi Bou was born in Barcelona in 1979 and raised in Prat del Llobregat.

Bou's love for nature began through walks with his grandfather to the wetlands of Delta del Llobregat. In 2003 he graduated in geology at the University of Barcelona and in photography at Grisart International Photography School. After 2003 he focused on the world of fashion and advertising, working as a lighting technician for several photographers.

In 2009 he founded a photo retouching studio. Also for four years, he taught digital photography and post-production.

In 2012 he embarked on Ornithographies.

== Ornithographies ==
From beginning the project in 2015, Bou has focused on bird flights capturing the contours drawn by birds in motion, or, as he has said, "to make visible the invisible".

Bou says that he feels like a curator looking for hidden drawings that birds make in the sky with their flights.

Depending on the type of flight, the result could be regular patterns, like flamingoes in a V formation, or chaotic lines like swifts looking for insects in the air.

One of the favorite birds are clouds of starlings when they do their murmuration dance, especially when this group is behind attacked by hawks, as Bou says in an Atlas Obscura article: "I am passionate about the idea of how a sculptor, the hawk, shapes the shapes of starling clouds", he says.

With this project Bou created a multimedia project called Murmurations. Most of the images were made in Catalonia or in the area of the Iberian Peninsula. However, he also worked in Iceland and the United States.

== Technique ==
To show several seconds into a single image Bou uses the chronophotography technique. It is a technique created at the end of the 19th century, known through its main representatives: Eadweard Muybridge, Étienne-Jules Marey and Ottomar Anschütz. This consists of taking many photographs in a row and then combining them all into a single one.

In the first stage of the study, in which Bou invested five years, he used his own camera. Subsequently, to perfect the technique and photographs, he used professional digital cinema cameras. These cameras allow him to take 25 to 120 frames in a second at a high-resolution.

== Exhibitions ==
=== Solo exhibitions ===
- Ornithographies at The Cardinal Gallery, Toronto 2022.
- Project presentation at the Observatorio, Barcelona, Spain, 2015
- Part of Leonardo, or the dream of ying exhibition at Museum Twentsewelle, Holland, 2017
- NPO Swiss Cancer League, Switzerland, 2017
- Mijas Contemporary Art Centre, Spain, 2017
- Fine Art Igualada Photo Festival, Spain, 2018
- Casa Golferich, Barcelona, Spain, 2018
- Festival Chapitre Nature, France, 2018
- Triple Space art Galery, Rusia, 2018
- Stream unconference, Greece, 2018
- VIPHOTO festival, Euskadi, 2018
- Punt De Vistes Art space, Barcelona, 2019
- Centro Fotográfico Alvarez Bravo, Oaxaca, México, 2019
- Université de Rennes, France, 2019/20
- Phyletisches Museum in Jena, Germany, 2020
- Mazier University, Saint Brieuc, 2020

=== Group exhibitions ===
- Freedom, Aperture Foundation, New York City 2017
- Bath House Cultural Center, Dallas, USA, 2019
