= David Freud, Baron Freud =

British politician and investment banker

The Right Honourable The Lord Freud PC
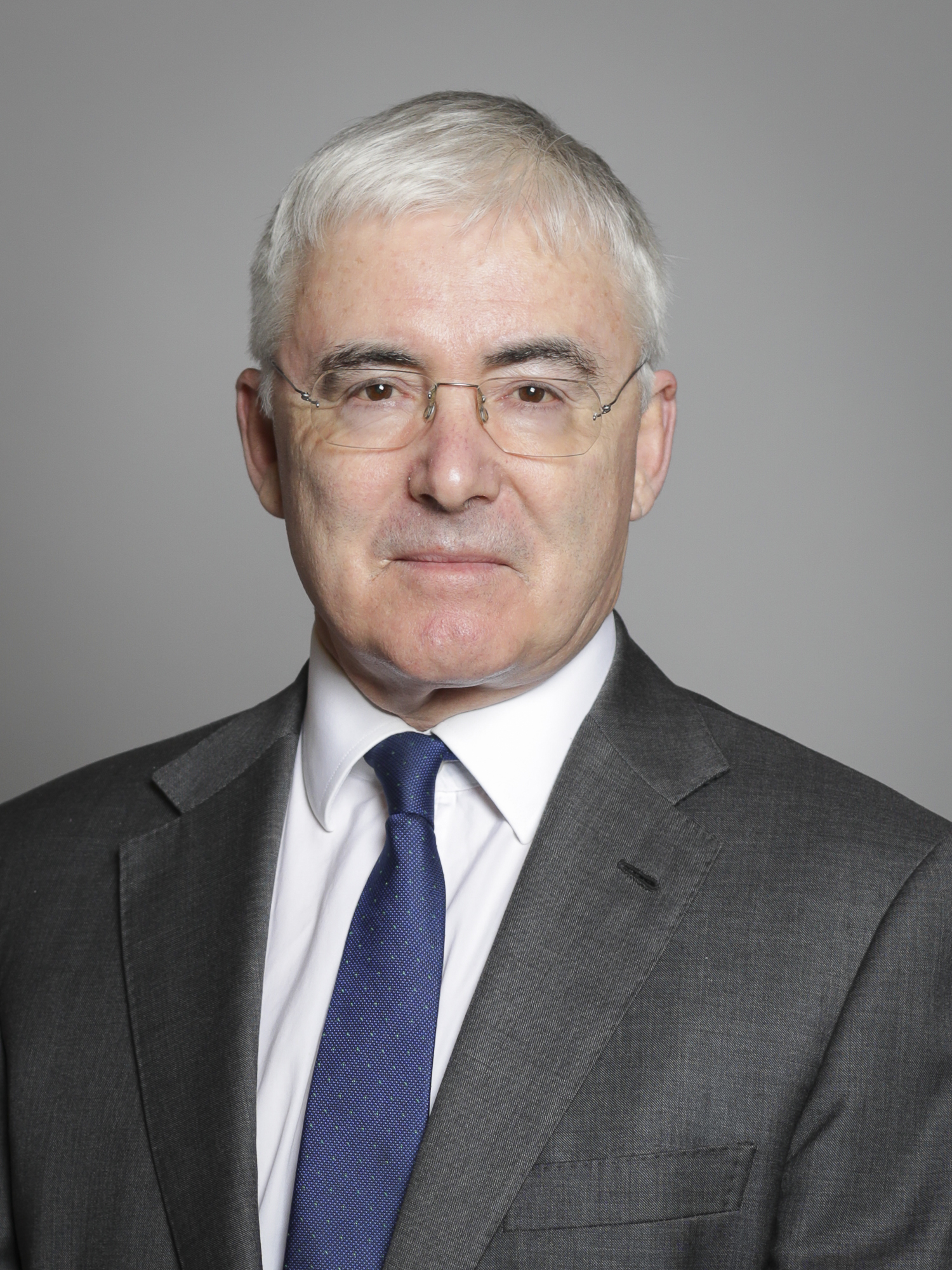
- Official portrait, 2019

Minister of State for Welfare Reform (Note: Parliamentary Under-Secretary of State from May 2010 to May 2015.)
- In office 11 May 2010 – 21 December 2016
- Prime Minister: David Cameron; Theresa May
- Preceded by: Jim Knight
- Succeeded by: The Lord Henley

Member of the House of Lords
- Lord Temporal
- Life peerage 27 June 2009

Personal details
- Born: 24 June 1950 (age 76)
- Party: Conservative
- Education: Merton College, Oxford

David Anthony Freud, Baron Freud, PC (born 24 June 1950) is a British politician, life peer, and former investment banker who served as Minister for Welfare Reform from 2010 to 2016. Before he joined the Conservative Party, he was vice-chairman of investment banking at UBS and a government adviser on welfare reform.

== Early life and career ==
Freud is the son of Walter Freud and a great-grandson of the pioneering psychoanalyst Sigmund Freud. He was educated at Whitgift School, Croydon, and Merton College, Oxford, where he took a Master of Arts degree in philosophy, politics and economics.

After starting out at the Western Mail, Freud worked at the Financial Times for eight years as a journalist. In 1983, Freud was hired by the stockbroking firm then known as Rowe & Pitman. Later, he worked for S G Warburg, which was taken over by UBS. He was vice-chairman of investment banking at UBS before he retired. In 2006, Freud published his autobiographical book Freud in the City which describes his life and work as a merchant banker in the City of London.

== Political career ==
In 2006, Freud was asked by Tony Blair to review the UK's welfare-to-work system, with Blair having been impressed by Freud's raising of finance for Eurotunnel and EuroDisney while at UBS. However, many of Freud's ideas were not implemented because of objections made by Gordon Brown. Freud's 2007 report titled Reducing dependency, increasing opportunity: options for the future of welfare to work called for the greater use of private sector companies who would be paid by results, for substantial resources to be made available to help lone parents and people on Incapacity Benefit back into work, and for a single working-age benefit payment to replace Housing Benefit, Jobseekers Allowance, etc. His central thesis was that spending on 'delivery' – such as schemes to get people back to work – would save money in the long run because there would be fewer people being paid money in the form of benefits. Freud wrote:

Given the active labour market policies now pursued in the UK, there is a close link between effective expenditure on employment programmes and expenditure on working age benefits. Effective spending by the [DWP] on labour market policies or administration can result in real reductions in benefit expenditure (and vice versa)

During the 2008 financial crisis, Freud became an adviser to Work and Pensions Secretary James Purnell and was asked to "help implement nothing less than a revolution in the welfare state" after a "sea change in Labour's thinking about the benefits system". Some of his ideas were incorporated into a white paper published later that year. However, he came to the belief the Conservative Party was "more likely to implement his radical reforms" and announced he would switch to working with the Conservatives. Purnell later resigned after Gordon Brown refused to cut welfare spending. On 27 June 2009, Freud was made a life peer after his name was put forward by the Conservative leadership. He then became a shadow minister in David Cameron's frontbench team.

When the Cameron–Clegg coalition was formed in 2010, Freud was made Parliamentary Under Secretary of State for Welfare Reform at the Department for Work and Pensions. In 2012, he outlined some of his thoughts on welfare reform in an interview by saying: "People who are poorer should be prepared to take the biggest risks, they've got least to lose. We have, through our welfare system, created a system which has made them reluctant to take risks, so we need to turn that on its head and make the system predictable so that people will take those risks". In the same interview, he said his primary concerns were the "nooks and crannies" in the benefits system where people could sit for long periods without ongoing scrutiny. He claimed the people who did this were: "The incapacity benefits, the lone parents, the people who are self-employed for year after year but only earn hundreds of pounds or a few thousand pounds, the people waiting for their work capability assessment then not going to it - all kinds of areas where people are able to have a lifestyle off benefits and actually off conditionality".

In 2012, he argued that many people were on benefits as a "lifestyle choice" rather than using it as a safety net. In 2013, he stated in a House of Lords speech, to much criticism, that the number of food banks were increasing because people want free food rather than growing poverty.

In 2014, Labour MPs called for Freud's resignation after he was secretly recorded responding to a question posed at a fringe meeting of the Conservative Party conference. The question was whether some people with disabilities should work for a token sum in order to enjoy the non-financial advantages of engaging in the world of work, perhaps with their wages topped up by benefit payments. Freud agreed that there was a small group of disabled people who were "not worth the full wage" and said he would go away and think about it. Freud had to apologise. He said: "I was foolish to accept the premise of the question...I care passionately about disabled people...that is why through Universal Credit...we have increased overall spending on disabled households by £250 million, offered the most generous work allowance ever, and increased the disability addition to £360 per month".

After the Conservatives won the general election in May 2015, Freud was promoted to Minister of State at the DWP, where he was given an enhanced role in overseeing the expansion of the Universal Credit scheme. He stepped down from his government role at the end of December 2016.

In February 2021, the House of Lords Commissioner for Standards ruled that Freud had breached the code of conduct for peers by writing to judges to argue against the release of character references given in ex-Conservative MP Charlie Elphicke's trial for sexually assaulting two women, finding Lord Freud breached the House of Lords' code of conduct "by failing to act on his personal honour". Freud made a formal apology in the House of Lords.

Freud was regarded as the architect of the Universal Credit, which was legislated for in 2012. In 2021, he launched his book titled Clashing Agendas about the battles with the Treasury over the introduction of Universal Credit.

== Personal life ==
Along with the late Martin Gilbert, Freud has acted as a long-term trustee of the Portland Trust, a not-for-profit London-based foundation set up to promote co-operation between Israel and Palestine through economic development. Between 2005 and 2008, he was its chief executive.

Freud is a president of Volunteering Matters, UK's volunteering charity founded in 1962.

Freud is President of the Freud Museum London.

Freud has appeared in the TV programme Time Team (series 13, episode 6) about the village of Eastry.

He is married to a nurse and has three grown-up children.

== Arms ==
Coat of arms of David Freud, Baron Freud
| Crest An elephant's head Azure armed Argent and grasping in the trunk a quill in bend sinister also Argent spined Or. Escutcheon Azure a pile reversed terminating in a roundel Argent and surmounted by two bars conjoined to two flaunches Or each charged with a flauch Azure. Supporters On either side a bat the wings displayed and inverted Argent the limbs Or membered Argent. Motto Frangar Non Flectar Badge Three bats displayed in pairle heads inwards the wings displayed and inverted Argent the limbs Or membered Argent. |

== Notes ==
Orders of precedence in the United Kingdom
| Preceded by The Lord Davies of Abersoch | Gentlemen; Baron Freud | Followed by The Lord Sugar |
