= Arab Bank =

Jordanian bank

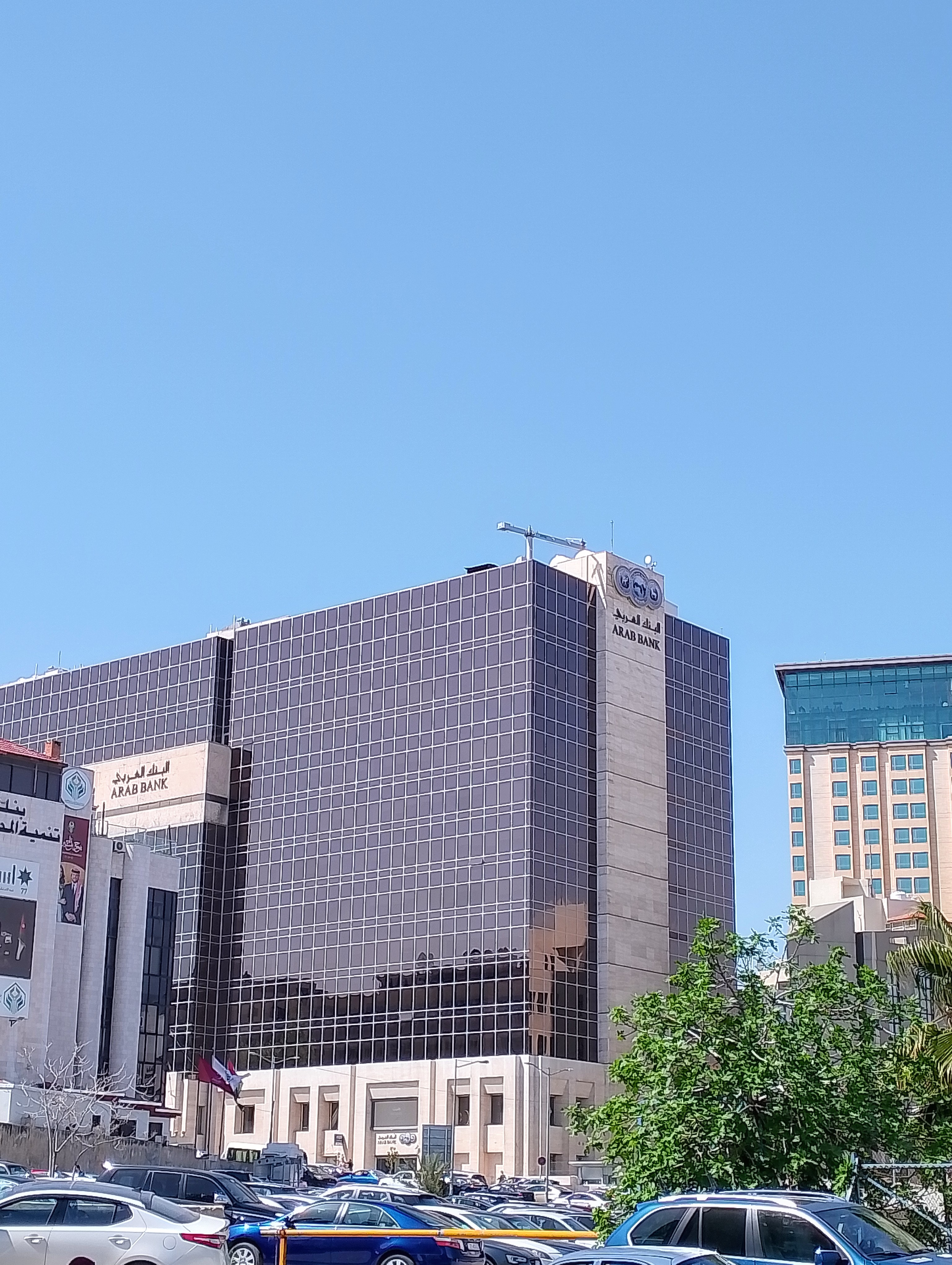
- Headquarters in Amman
- Native name: البنك العربي
- Type: Private bank
- Traded as: XAMM:ARBK
- Industry: Banking
- Founded: 1930; 96 years ago
- Founder: Abdul Hameed Shoman
- Headquarters: Amman, Jordan
- Number of locations: 187 (2025)
- Key people: Sabih al-Masri (Chairman); Randa El Sadek (CEO)
- Products: Retail banking, Commercial bank, and Investment banking
- Operating income: USD 3,6 billion (2025)
- Net income: USD 1,13 billion (2025)
- Total assets: USD 78,2 billion (2025)
- Total equity: USD 13,2 billion (2025)
- Number of employees: 7216 (2025)
- Subsidiaries: Islamic International Arab Bank
- Website: www.arabbank.com

Arab Bank is a Jordanian bank that is one of the largest financial institutions in the Middle East. It is headquartered today in Amman, Jordan, and operates as a universal bank that serves clients in more than 600 branches spanning five continents. Arab Bank is a publicly held shareholding company listed on the Amman Stock Exchange.

The bank is a major economic engine in Jordan and throughout the Middle East and North Africa region, providing banking services and capital, and facilitating development and trade throughout the region. According to its website in 2018, the bank was the highest-ranked by market capitalization, and represented approximately 25% of the Amman Stock Exchange.

U.S. appellate courts have ruled in the bank's favor in several lawsuits filed in the 2000s alleging its involvement in facilitating the funding of terrorist organizations.

== History ==
=== Establishment (1940–1970s) ===
Arab Bank was founded in 1930 in Jerusalem, Mandatory Palestine, as the first private sector financial institution in the Arab world.

After the British Mandate Authority withdrew from Palestine in 1948, the Bank lost its branches in Jaffa and Haifa. When customers who were obliged to leave the country asked for their deposits, Arab Bank fully redeemed all claims. This decision won the Arab Bank a great reputation and became a historical turning point in its growth. The lost branches were re-established: Haifa branch was relocated to Beirut followed by Amman, Jaffa branch in Nablus and later Ramallah. When the branch in Jerusalem was caught up in the civil disturbance, the Bank’s activities were moved to offices within the old city of Jerusalem.

In 1948, the Bank’s headquarters were transferred to Amman, Jordan, where it was officially incorporated as a public shareholding company.

In the 1940s and 1950s, the bank grew to 43 branches in the Arab world and had JOD 5.5 million capital. During the 1960s, the bank focused on investments and became a catalyst for Arab economic developments when most other financial institutions avoided the risk.

The 1960s brought along a wave of Nationalization which swept the Arab world as country after country gained independence from British and French colonial rule. Branches in Egypt and Syria were nationalized in 1961, Iraq in 1964, Aden in 1969, and finally Sudan and Libya in 1970. Within a period of ten years, Arab Bank lost a total of 25 branches. When Israel occupied the West Bank and the Gaza Strip in 1967, more branches were closed. The bank carried on its expansion. In 1961, the bank opened its first international location, becoming the first Arab financial institution to establish a presence in Switzerland. A sister institution, Arab Bank Switzerland, was established in Zurich in 1962 with another branch in Geneva opening in 1964.

In 1974, after his father's death, Abd Al-Majeed Shoman was named Chairman and General Manager of Arab Bank. Under his leadership, the bank expanded its scope of products and services into new areas of business. Though it previously emphasized trade and small-scale construction finance, the bank undertook a leading role in large-scale project finance, both directly and through participation in syndicated loans. By the 1990s, the bank added investment banking to its services. In the mid-1990s, the bank was given permission by the Central Bank of Jordan and the Israeli Central Bank to reopen in the West Bank/Gaza under the supervision of both the CBJ and the Palestinian Monetary Authority.

=== Expansion (2000–2010) ===
In May 2000, Abd Al Majeed's son Abdel Hamid became CEO. Under his leadership, the Arab Bank reopened operations in Syria in 2005, and took steps to commence its activities in Iraq, circumstances permitting. In January 2007, Arab Bank established Europe Arab Bank (EAB), a London-based, fully owned subsidiary. It also acquired 50% of MNG Bank in Turkey (now known as Turkland Bank) and 50% of Al Nisr Al Arabi Insurance company in Jordan, thus introducing bancassurance to its product variety. Also, the group established Arab Bank-Syria. In 2008, Arab Bank partnered with Vasco, now OneSpan, to work on the bank's authentication technology.

Over the next few years, the bank opened branches in Frankfurt, London, Australia, New York and Singapore. Following the Oslo Peace Accords between Israel and Palestine, at the invitation of Israel, Arab Bank opened branches in several Palestinian towns with broad governmental support.

=== 2010's ===
Today, Arab Bank provides consumer banking services, as well as corporate and institutional banking services to individuals, corporations, government agencies and other international financial institutions.

After years of being ranked A− from Fitch, A− from Standard & Poor, and A3 from Moody's, the bank's rankings were dropped twice in 2011. Moody's first downgraded its Local Currency Deposit Rating to Baa1, and then downgraded the bank's Financial Strength Rating to a C− from a C. In both instances, Moody's noted the decision was based on an analysis of political instability in the region. In April 2012, Moody's announced a possible downgrade of the bank's current Financial Strength Rating as well as its local currency long- and short-term deposit ratings. In November 2011, Standard & Poor's lowered its long-term counterparty credit ratings to 'BB' from 'BB+', noting the ratings are constrained by the local currency ratings on the sovereign. As of 25 January 2012, Fitch still had Arab Bank ranked at an A−. In April 2023, Fitch rated its Viability Rating (VR) b+.

As of 2018 the bank reported net income after tax of $820.5 million as compared to $533 million in 2017 with net income before tax reaching $1.1 billion. The Group's equity grew to reach $8.7 billion, while the return on equity increased to reach 9.5%. The Group's net operating income grew by 8% driven by growth in net interest and commission income. Credit facilities increased by 3% to reach $25.8 billion, while customer deposits increased to reach $34.3 billion.

As the only Jordanian organization ranked among the top 10 organizations in the Arab world, Arab Bank has shown great progress in its ESG performance throughout the years. During 2014, the bank was ranked at the fifth level and was able to move up to the fourth level during 2015, with a total weight of 2.78%.

Arab Bank has subsidiaries in a small number of countries, including Australia (Arab Bank Australia) and Switzerland (Arab Bank Switzerland).

=== 2020's ===
In 2023, Arab Bank was named "Middle East Bank of the Year" by The Banker magazine, owned by the Financial Times.

In 2023, it had assets of $68.3 billion (up 6% from 2022) and net income of $829.6 million (up 52% from 2022). Also under ESG, the bank made its first sustainable perpetual issuance of $250 million in AT1 (Tier 1 capital securities).

Arab Bank was ranked 36th on Forbes Middle East's Top 100 Listed Companies 2025 list.

== International Operations ==
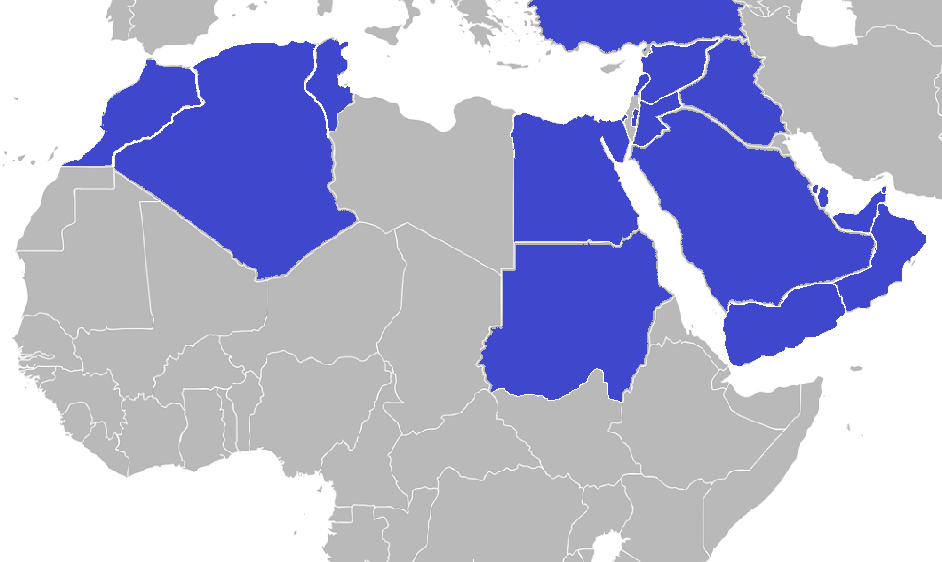
International presence (2026)

=== Africa ===
- Algeria: Operating since 2001. 11 branches.
- Egypt: (Arab Bank Egypt). 42 branches.
- Morocco: Operating since 1962. 3 branches.
- Sudan: (Arab Sudanese Bank). Operating since 2008.
- Tunisia: (Arab Tunisian Bank). 64,3% Shareholding.

=== Asia ===
- Australia: (Arab Bank Australia).
- Bahrain: Operating since 1960. 5 branches.
- Iraq: (Arab Bank Iraq). 63,7% Shareholding.
- Lebanon: Operating since 1944. 6 branches.
- Oman: (Oman Arab Bank). 49% Shareholding.
- Palestine: (Arab Bank Palestine). 33 branches.
- Qatar: Operating since 1957. 2 branches.
- Syria: (Arab Bank Syria).
- Saudi Arabia (Arab National Bank). 40% Shareholding.
- Turkey: (Turkland Bank). 50% Shareholding.
- United Arab Emirates: Operating since 1963. 8 branches.
- Yemen: Operating since 1972. 5 branches.

== Compliance ==
In 2006, the bank participated at the International Anti-Money Laundering/Combating Financing Terrorism Conference hosted by the Union of Arab Banks and supported by the United States Department of the Treasury. The conference sought to unite the public and private sector in strengthening defenses against terrorist financing and money laundering in the MENA region.

Since 2006, the bank has held a regulatory compliance summit with speakers from across the international banking community to discuss and learn more about the compliance environment. In 2008, at the request of the Association of Banks, Arab Bank hosted a compliance workshop attended by compliance professionals from banks throughout the country including the Central Bank of Jordan.

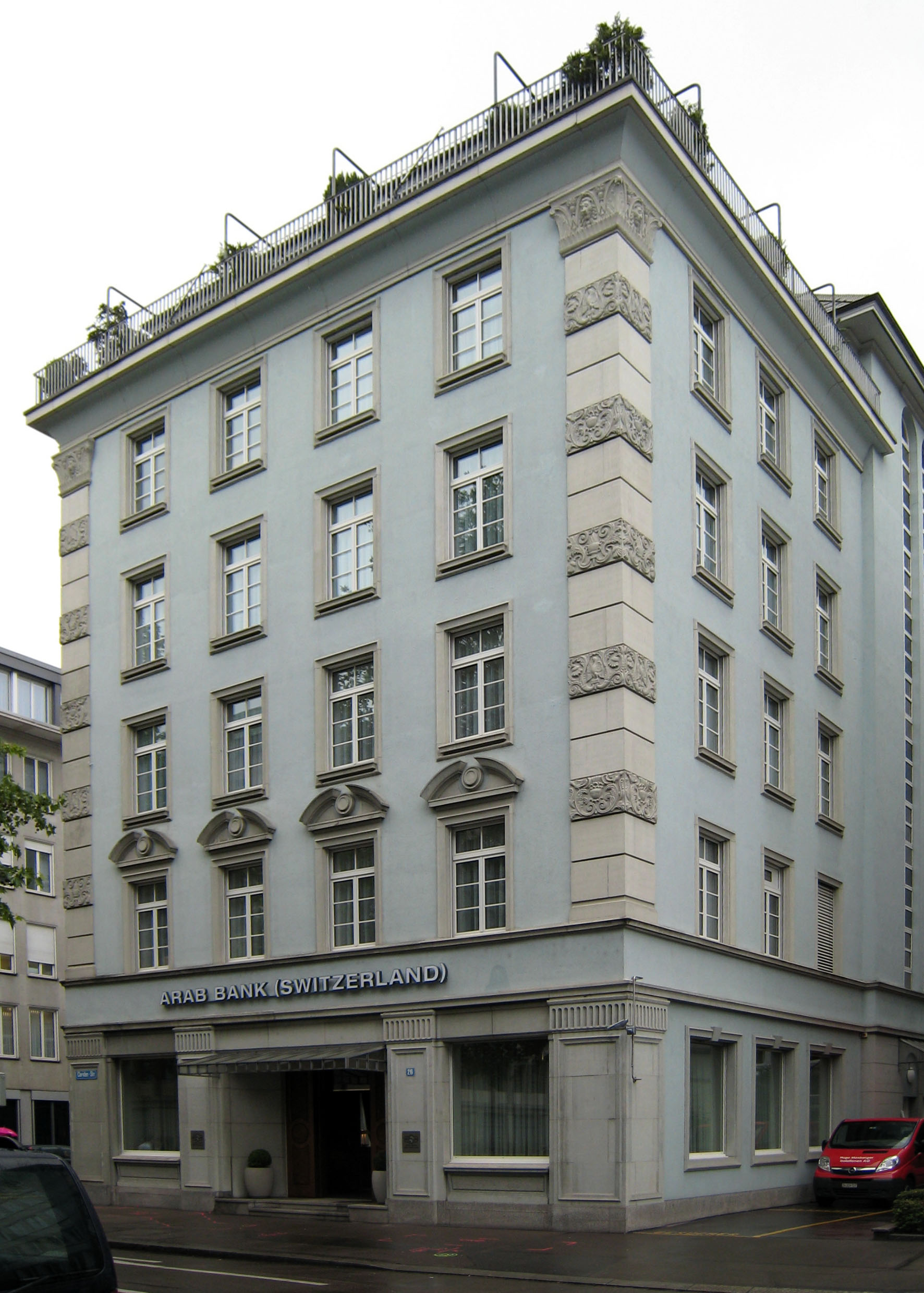
The Arab Bank building in Zürich, Switzerland.

=== Board of directors ===
As of 2023, the banks Board of directors were:

- Mr. Sabih Al Masri - Chairman
- Mr. Khaled Sabih Masri - Deputy Chairman
- Ministry of Finance, Saudi Arabia - Represented by Mr. Hisham Mohammed Attar - Member
- Social Security Corporation - Represented by Mr. Mohammed Adnan Al-Madi - Member
- Mr. Wahbe Abdullah Tamari - Member
- Mrs. Nadia Abdel Raouf Al Rawabdeh - Member
- Mr. Shahm Munib Al-Wir - Member
- Mr. Sharif Mohdi Saifi - Member
- Dr. Nabil Hani Alqaddumi - Member
- Mr. Omar Monther Fahoum - Member
- Mr. Majed Qustandi Sifri - Member

== Abd Al Hameed Shoman Foundation ==
In 1978, Arab Bank created the Abd Al-Hameed Shoman Foundation to promote social development in the Arab world in the fields of science and the humanities. It is one of the only foundations created by a private sector company in Jordan. The foundation organizes the Abd Al Hameed Shoman Cultural Forum which brings together leading scientists, educators and innovators of thoughtful discussion on today's cultural issues. In 2011, Arab Bank committed approximately 87% of its annual budget for community investment through the foundation.

In 2011, the bank donated over 8 million Jordanian dinars to its Abd Al-Hameed Shoman Foundation to support scientific research and studies in the humanities in Jordan and the Middle East. In late 2009, Arab Bank launched 'Together', a corporate social responsibility program that links five non-profits dedicated to poverty alleviation, education, orphan support, health and environmental protection. In 2011, Arab Bank donated more than 177,000 Jordanian dinars to the Together Program. In March 2011, Arab Bank Chairman Abdel Hamid Shoman announced the bank would be partnering with the private sector and allocating one million Jordanian Dinars for development projects to help fight against poverty and unemployment in Jordan.

== Past lawsuits ==
Several civil lawsuits were filed against the bank in the U.S. District Court for the Eastern District of New York in Brooklyn under the Anti-Terrorism Act and Alien Tort Statute in 2004, all of which resulted in decisions in favor of the bank. In these cases, U.S. and non-U.S. plaintiffs alleged they or their family members were harmed by acts of terrorism that occurred in Israel or the West Bank/Gaza from 1995 to 2005. They alleged that the bank held accounts for individuals and organizations that, in turn, supported terrorist activities. Similar cases were brought against UBS, Credit Lyonnais, Bank of China, American Express Bank, National Westminster Bank and Commerzbank.

On 9 February 2018, the U.S. Court of Appeals for the Second Circuit overturned a liability verdict in the case of Linde v. Arab Bank Plc in the U.S. District Court, Eastern District of New York (Brooklyn). The verdict overturned from 22 September 2014 after 30 days of trial and two days of jury deliberation, found the bank liable for knowingly supporting terrorism relating to 24 different terrorist acts. The Second Circuit found that the District Court erred in failing to provide the jury with adequate instructions during the court proceedings. In 2015, the bank reached a settlement with 597 victims or the relatives of victims of 22 Hamas attacks between 2001 and 2004 in Israel.

In 2013, the U.S. District Court for the Eastern District of New York dismissed Jesner v. Arab Bank, a case filed by 6,000 foreign citizens injured in Israel during the Second Intifada under the Alien Tort Statute (ATS), ruling that corporations are not proper defendants in ATS suits. The U.S. Court of Appeals for the Second Circuit unanimously affirmed this dismissal in December 2015. In April 2017, the Supreme Court of the United States granted the plaintiffs' petition to hear the case, Jesner v. Arab Bank, PLC. Oral arguments before the Supreme Court were held in October 2017, and on 24 April 2018, the Court affirmed the dismissal of all claims against the bank, finding that foreign corporations are not proper defendants in cases brought under the ATS.

On 6 November 2012, a U.S. judge dismissed a civil litigation action brought by Israeli resident Mati Gill under the Anti-Terrorism Act for injuries he sustained in an alleged terrorist attack in Israel in 2008.

In 2005, the U.S. Office of the Comptroller of the Currency and the Financial Crimes Enforcement Network assessed a $24 million penalty against the New York Branch of Arab Bank for failing to implement an adequate anti–money laundering program to manage the risks of money laundering and terrorist financing, and violating the suspicious activity reporting requirements of the Bank Secrecy Act. Arab Bank was also no longer allowed to process US dollar payments. On 1 October 2018, the U.S. Office of the Comptroller of the Currency terminated this consent order.

On 26 February 2004 the Israel Defense Forces confiscated funds from Arab Bank's and Cairo-Amman Bank's Ramallah branch in connection with an investigation into whether certain account holders were supporting terrorism. In September 2009, the IDF issued a letter to Arab Bank stating that it had no evidence that the bank or any of its directors or employees were involved in or funded terrorist activities.

In 2019, over 1,132 Israeli victims of terrorism and families of Israelis murdered in terrorist attacks filed a $5.8 billion lawsuit against Arab Bank, claiming that the bank cooperated with, supported, assisted, funded, and encouraged terrorist actions that resulted in thousands of casualties and wounded.

== See also ==
- List of banks in Jordan
