= The Portland Trust =

The Portland Trust is a British non-profit ‘action tank’ whose mission is to promote peace and stability between Israelis and Palestinians through economic development. They work with a range of partners to help develop the Palestinian private sector and relieve poverty through entrepreneurship in Israel.

The Portland Trust was founded in London in 2003 by Sir Ronald Cohen, co-founder and former chairman of the private equity firm Apax Partners, together with Sir Harry Solomon, co-founder and former chairman and CEO of Hillsdown Holdings.

The other trustees are Lord Freud, former Minister for Welfare Reform in the British government and former vice chairman of UBS Investment Banking, and Mick Davis, founding partner of x2 Resources.

In June 2005 The Portland Trust opened an office in Tel-Aviv, the chair is Yossi Bachar and the managing director is Gal Hauyt.

In April 2006, an office was opened in Ramallah under the direction of Samir Hulileh the current managing director is Kamel Husseini.

Nicola Cobbold has been the CEO of The Portland Trust between January 2009 and September 2015. Baron Frankal has been the CEO since 2021.

== Aims and focus ==
They are involved in a number of important initiatives, including the development of financial and economic infrastructure, trade and investment and entrepreneurship.

Since its launch in 2003, the Trust has consistently highlighted the important role of economics in resolving the Middle East conflict. It is a critical element alongside improved security and political process to achieve a sustainable and lasting peace.

Its approach is supported by evidence from other conflict situations – Northern Ireland, Bosnia Herzegovina and more broadly through research carried out jointly with the International Institute for Strategic Studies in London. In Northern Ireland economic discussions became a platform for political settlement. The private sector pushed for moderation, and during difficult periods of the conflict, public sector financial support and employment underpinned the economy.
