= Harry Solomon (businessman) =

- Born: 20 March 1937 (age 89); Middlesbrough, Yorkshire, England, United Kingdom
- Occupation: Businessman
- Known for: Co-founder of Hillsdown Holdings

Sir Harry Solomon (born 20 March 1937) is the founder of Hillsdown Holdings, one of the United Kingdom's largest food businesses.

== Career ==
Solomon was born in Middlesbrough, Yorkshire, to Jacob Eli Solomon and Belle Brechner. Educated at St Albans School in Hertfordshire, Harry Solomon qualified as a solicitor in 1960 and went on to practise law. He founded Solomon Taylor & Shaw in Hampstead in the 1970s.

In 1976, he co-founded Hillsdown Holdings and built it into one of the United Kingdom's largest food businesses. He retired from the business in 1993.

He is now the co-founder and vice chairman of the Portland Trust, which promotes peace and stability between the Israelis and the Palestinians. He is also a Non-Executive Director of Portland Capital and a Fellow of the Royal College of Physicians.

Solomon is a member of the Norwood Advisory Council.

He was knighted in 1991 for services to the food industry.

He has provided some funding to Forward Thinking, a charitable organisation addressing issues related to promoting greater understanding and inclusion of Muslims in the UK and the Middle East peace process.

In 2014, the Western Galilee College in Akko, Israel, has opened new business school named "the Sir Harry Solomon School of Management".

In 2015, Harry Solomon received the Lifetime Achievement Award at the British Israeli Business Awards.

== Family ==
In 1962, he married Judith Diana Manuel. They have one son and two daughters: Louise Sara (born 1964), Daniel Mark (born 1965) and Juliet Kate (born 1969).
