= Arab Jordan Investment Bank =

Jordanian bank

- Native name: بنك الاستثمار العربي الأردني
- Company type: Public
- Traded as: Amman Stock Exchange
- Industry: Banking
- Founded: 1978; 48 years ago
- Headquarters: Amman, Jordan
- Key people: Hani Al-Qadi (Chairman); Raed Al Massis (GM)
- Products: Current and saving accounts, Personal loans, Overdraft facility, Home loans, Car loans, Credit cards, Term deposits, Funds transfer, Currency exchange, Investment opportunities, Commercial lending, Project and structured finance, Private banking, Asset management, Brokerage, Money markets, Foreign exchange, Capital markets, Commercial lending, Term financing, Project and structured finance, Corporate finance and capital markets
- Total equity: 150,000,000 JD
- Website: www.ajib.com

The Arab Jordan Investment Bank (AJIB) is a Jordanian bank established in Amman in 1978.

It serves in Jordan, Qatar and Cyprus. It opened its branch in Limassol, Cyprus, in 1989, and in 2006 its Qatari branch was established.

== See also ==
- List of banks in Jordan
