= Stream unconference =

WPP Stream
- Founded: 2007; 19 years ago
- Website: www.wppstream.com

Stream is a series of digital unconferences hosted by WPP. It is run by volunteers and sponsored by some of WPP's agency clients. Stream Europe takes place in Greece in October each year and hosts over three hundred people in the creative, media and technology industries. Attendees discuss and debate ideas and opportunities in the areas of culture, innovation and the internet.

Stream 07, 08, 09 and '10 have all been hosted by Sir Martin Sorrell, CEO of WPP, and Yossi Vardi, internet investor, and founder of Kinnernet.

Stream Asia launched in 2011, and Stream Local events now take place in cities around the world (including London, Moscow, São Paulo, Paris and Berlin) where digital leaders can get together to discuss and debate the future. Stream Africa has taken place in South Africa since 2014.

From 2018, when Mark Read became the new CEO of WPP, Stream became a central part of the company's identity and more of the events started to be hosted at other locations around the world including during SXSW and Cannes.

== Participants ==
Participants at Stream events include leaders in the creative, media and technology industries. The goal is to have a mix of senior executives, startups, technologists and creatives to discuss some of the world's most pressing issues in an open forum.

== Press ==
Stream is a private event, and is designed for the attendees on-site. However, prominent bloggers and writers have attended the event over the past few years, generating coverage from attendees such as Tim O'Reilly, Jeff Pulver, Andrew Keen and David Rowan, Editor of Wired UK. Business Week and the Daily Telegraph has covered the event.

Wired UK called it one of the most important tech conferences in the world. Stream won "Best Conference" at the 2009 Event Awards.
