= Samir Hulileh =

Palestinian businessman and politician

Cabinet Secretary of the Palestinian Authority
- In office 2006–?

Personal details
- Born: 1957 (age 68–69) Kuwait
- Education: American University of Beirut
- Occupation: Businessman, economist

Samir Hulileh (also Hleileh, Huleileh, Arabic سمير حليلة), born in Kuwait in 1957, is considered one of Palestine's leading business people and is the Chief Executive Officer of Palestine Development and Investment Ltd. (PADICO). He represents PADICO HOLDING on several boards of subsidiary companies, including Palestine Telecommunications Group (PALTEL), Palestine Securities Exchange (PSE), Palestine Real Estate Investment Company (PRICO), and Palestine Mortgage and Housing Corporation (PMHC). He is also Chairman of Jericho Gate Real Estate Investment. After he graduated with an MSc Economics from the American University of Beirut in 1983, Hulileh went on to join the board of the Palestine Banking Corporation in 1988, after which he became the Managing Director of the Ramallah branch of The Portland Trust. He was former Assistant Under Secretary for the Ministry of the Economy and Trade between 1994 and 1997. He was also Cabinet Secretary to the Palestinian Authority in 2006. He is also chairman of the board of Palestine International Business Forum and chairman of Portland Trust, Ramallah. He serves as an advisory board member of the one Voice movement. He also is on the board of the Palestinian-British Business Council, Palestinian-Russian Business Council, and Palestine Economic Policy Research Institute (MAS). He is also a member of the board of trustees of the Friends Schools in Ramallah and The International Chamber of Commerce and is the Chairman of Birzeit University Alumni Association. He has also been the chairman of the board of the Palestine Trade Organisation (PalTRADE) and has represented Palestinian businesses and Palestinian economic development across the world. He has worked at Birzeit University. He was one of the board of directors for the Palestinian Banking Corporation and also serves on the board of the Applied Research Institute (ARIJ) in Bethlehem and the Arab Thought Forum in Jerusalem.
