= Abdul Hameed Shoman =

Palestinian-American businessman

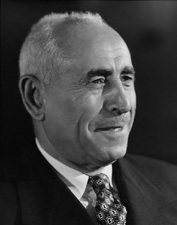
Abdul Hameed Shoman

Abdel Hamid Shoman (Arabic: عبد الحميد شومان; born in 1888 – died on September 12, 1974) was a prominent Palestinian businessman, philanthropist, and banker. He is best known as the founder of the Arab Bank (Arabic: البنك العربي), which became one of the largest financial institutions in the Middle East. Shoman's contributions to the region's banking sector and his philanthropic efforts have left a lasting legacy.

== Life and education ==
Shoman was born in 1890 in Beit Hanina, a village near Jerusalem, in the then Ottoman Empire. He came from a modest family background and had limited formal education. His father is Ahmed, and his siblings are Issa, Musa, and Yusuf. His children are Abdul Majeed from his first wife, who died while he was abroad, and Khaled and Najwa from his second wife, Saniyya, the daughter of Ahmad Hilmi Abd al-Baqi. He received his initial education in a traditional school (kuttab) but did not complete it and instead began working in the village quarries. In 1911, Abdul Hamid Shoman emigrated to the United States.

=== Career in the United States ===
In the United States, Shoman initially worked in various manual labor jobs before venturing into the business world. Also, he engaged in various social, charitable, and journalistic activities. He engaged in trade and commerce, gradually amassing enough capital to pursue larger business endeavors. He purchased land for a cemetery for New York Muslims, supported Arab students, and helped Arabic-language newspapers. Shoman also published his own Arabic newspaper, Al-Dabbur, and collected donations to support national movements in Palestine and Syria. Shoman's time in the United States was crucial in shaping his entrepreneurial spirit and vision for the future.

== Founding of Arab Bank ==
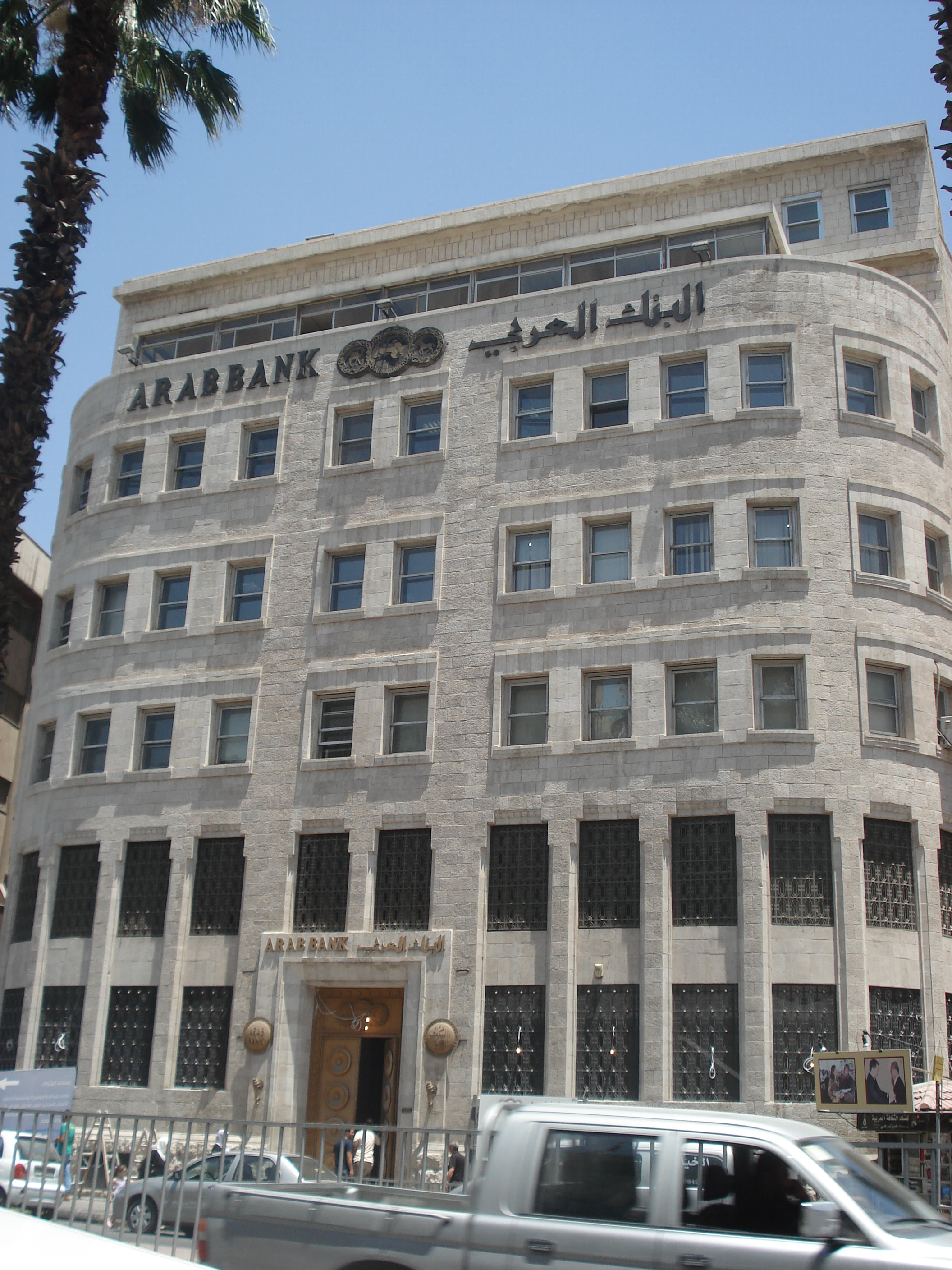
Old Arab Bank building, located in Amman Downtown.

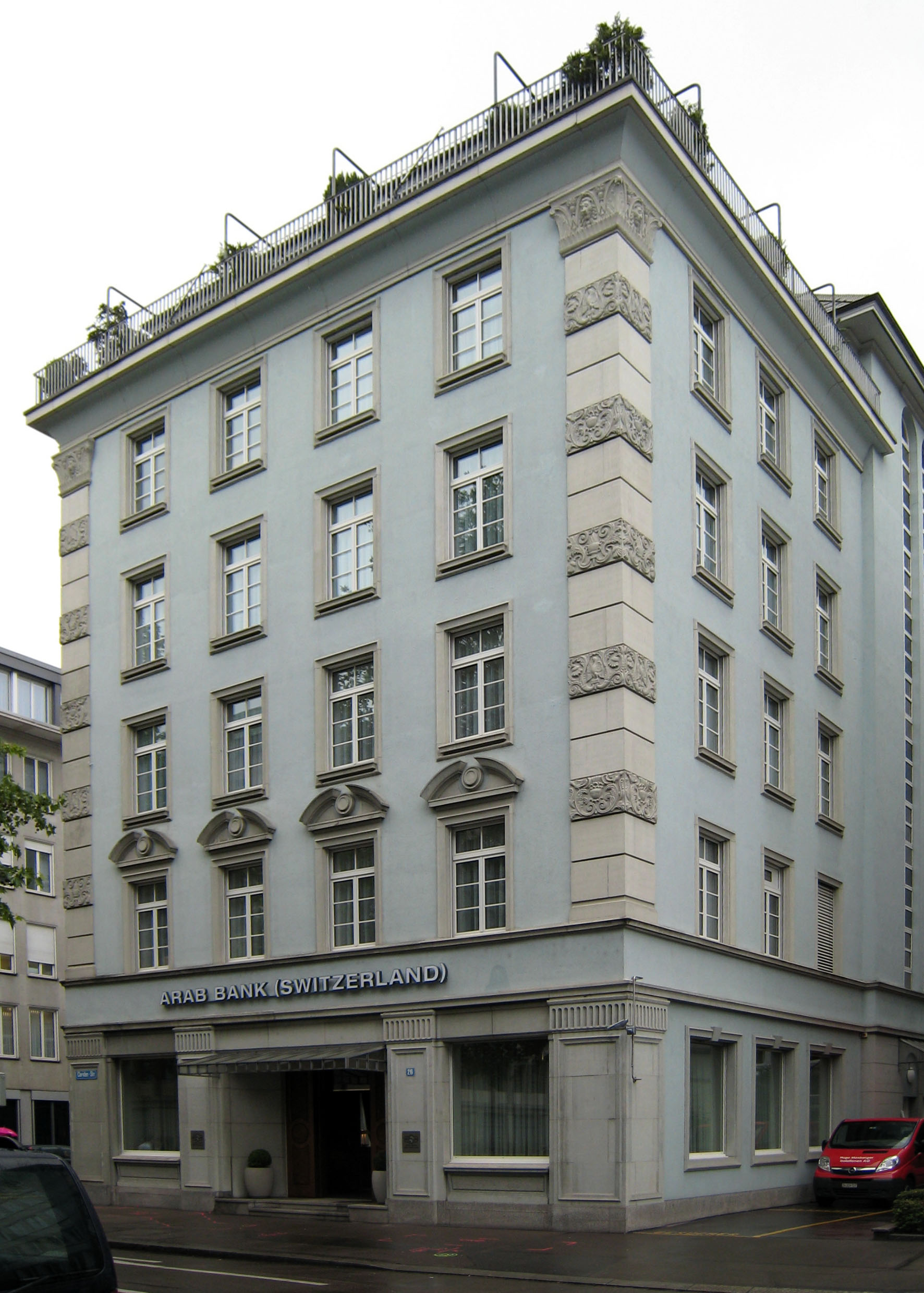
The Arab Bank building in Zürich, Switzerland.

In 1930, Shoman returned to the Middle East with the ambition to establish a financial institution that would serve the Arab world. He founded the Arab Bank in Jerusalem with a starting capital of 15,000 Palestinian pounds. The bank aimed to support economic development and provide financial services to the Arab community, which was largely underserved at the time.

Under Shoman's leadership, the Arab Bank expanded rapidly, opening branches in major cities across the Middle East and North Africa. The bank played a vital role in financing infrastructure projects, supporting trade, and fostering economic growth in the region.

== Leadership amidst political turmoil ==
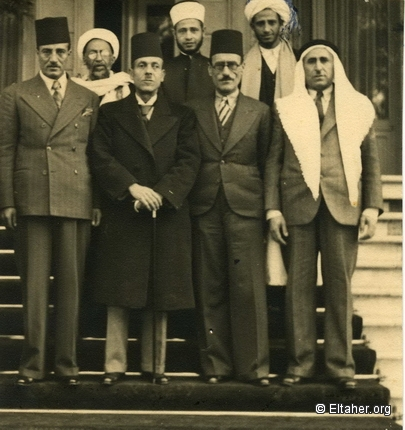
Abdul Hamid Shoman appears in the first row from the right on an unknown occasion. The photo was taken at the entrance to the old Semiramis InterContinental Hotel in Cairo in December 1938 or 1939.

Abdul Hamid Shoman was one of the five delegates representing the National Committee at the "Conference of National Committees" in Jerusalem on May 7, 1936. At this conference, they decided to declare a non-payment of taxes until the British government changed its pro-Zionist policies. Subsequently, Shoman was elected to the "Supply and Boycott Committee," established to assist those affected by the general strike. In July 1936, British authorities arrested Shoman, along with other Palestinian patriots like Akram Zuaiter and Rifaat al-Nimr, and detained them in Sarafand prison near Ramla. He was detained for a few months and was arrested again in 1938, this time in Mazraa prison near Acre.

Despite the chaos of the 1948 Nakba, Shoman managed to preserve the deposits of thousands of citizens in his bank and successfully established branches in several Arab and foreign countries. This effort helped transform the Arab Bank into a globally significant Palestinian financial institution.

Shoman also recommended establishing an institution to support cultural affairs and fund scientific, intellectual, medical, and technological research in the Arab world. Following his death, the Abdul Hameed Shoman Foundation was established in 1978 in Amman by his son Abdul Majeed. The foundation includes the Abdul Hameed Shoman Cultural Forum, a public library and information system, a children's library, and Darat al Funun.

Abdul Hamid Shoman maintained close relationships with numerous Arab leaders and politicians, symbolizing self-made success, patriotism, and generosity. Along with his relative and father-in-law, Ahmed Hilmi Pasha, Shoman played a crucial role in leading Palestinian banking and is credited with saving the Arab Bank during the catastrophic Nakba.

== Philanthropy and legacy ==
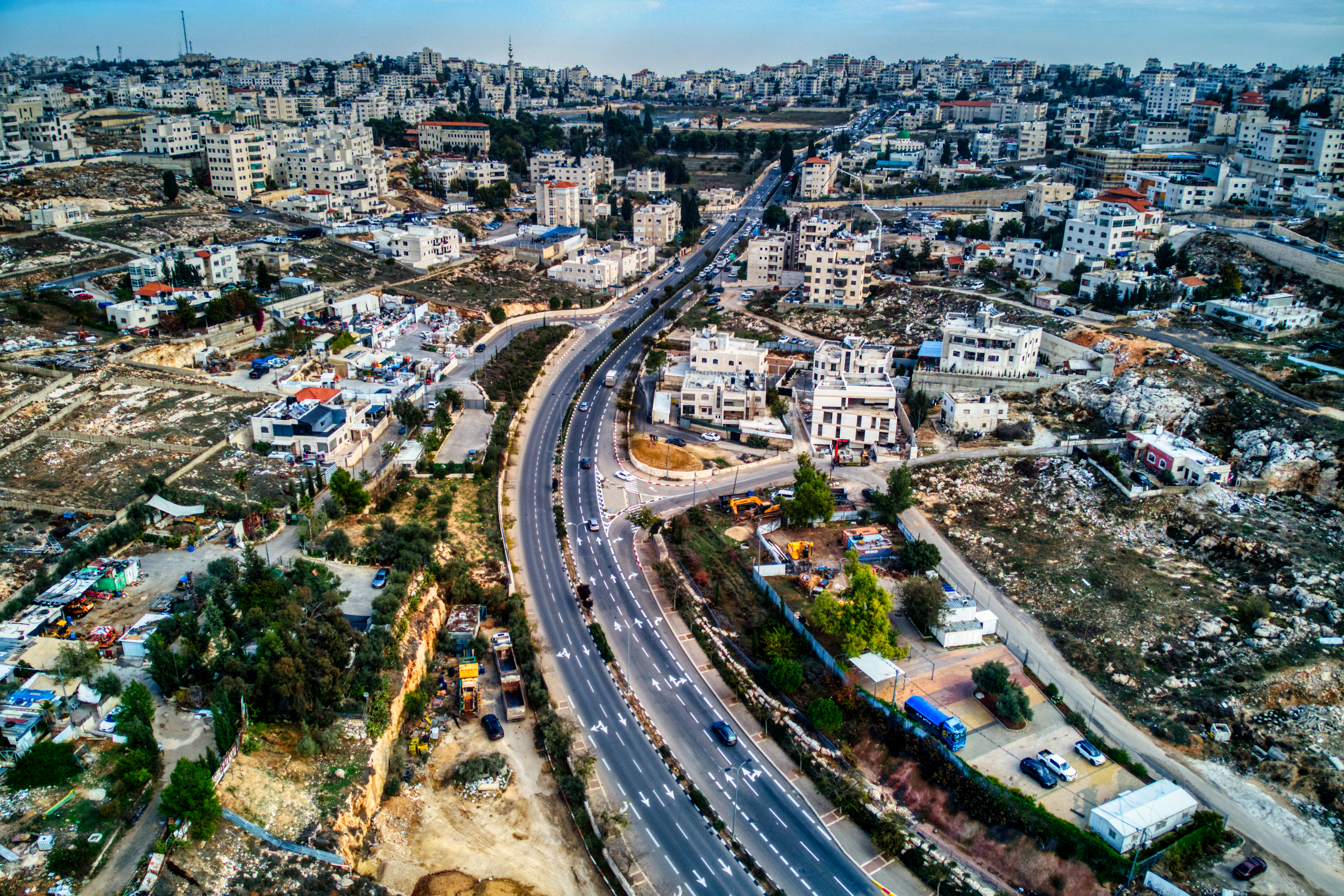
Abdul Hameed Shoman Street and its surroundings.

Apart from his banking career, Shoman was deeply committed to philanthropy. He established the Abdul Hameed Shoman Foundation (Arabic: مؤسسة عبد الحميد شومان) in 1972, dedicated to promoting education, culture, and scientific research in the Arab world. The foundation supports various initiatives, including scholarships, cultural programs, and scientific research grants. Shoman's contributions to society extended beyond his lifetime. The Arab Bank continued to grow, becoming one of the leading financial institutions in the region. His philanthropic foundation remains active, supporting numerous projects and initiatives aimed at advancing knowledge and development in the Arab world.

== Death and recognition ==
Abdel Hamid Shoman died on September 12, 1974, leaving behind a legacy of economic and social impact. He is remembered as a visionary entrepreneur and philanthropist who played a significant role in shaping the banking sector in the Middle East.

== Bibliography ==
- Shoman, Abdul Hameed (1982). العصامي: سيرة عبد الحميد شومان، 1890–1974 [The Self-Made: The Biography of Abdul Hameed Shoman, 1890–1974] (in Arabic). Arab Institute for Research and Publishing.
