= Sabih al-Masri =

Jordanian-Palestinian businessman

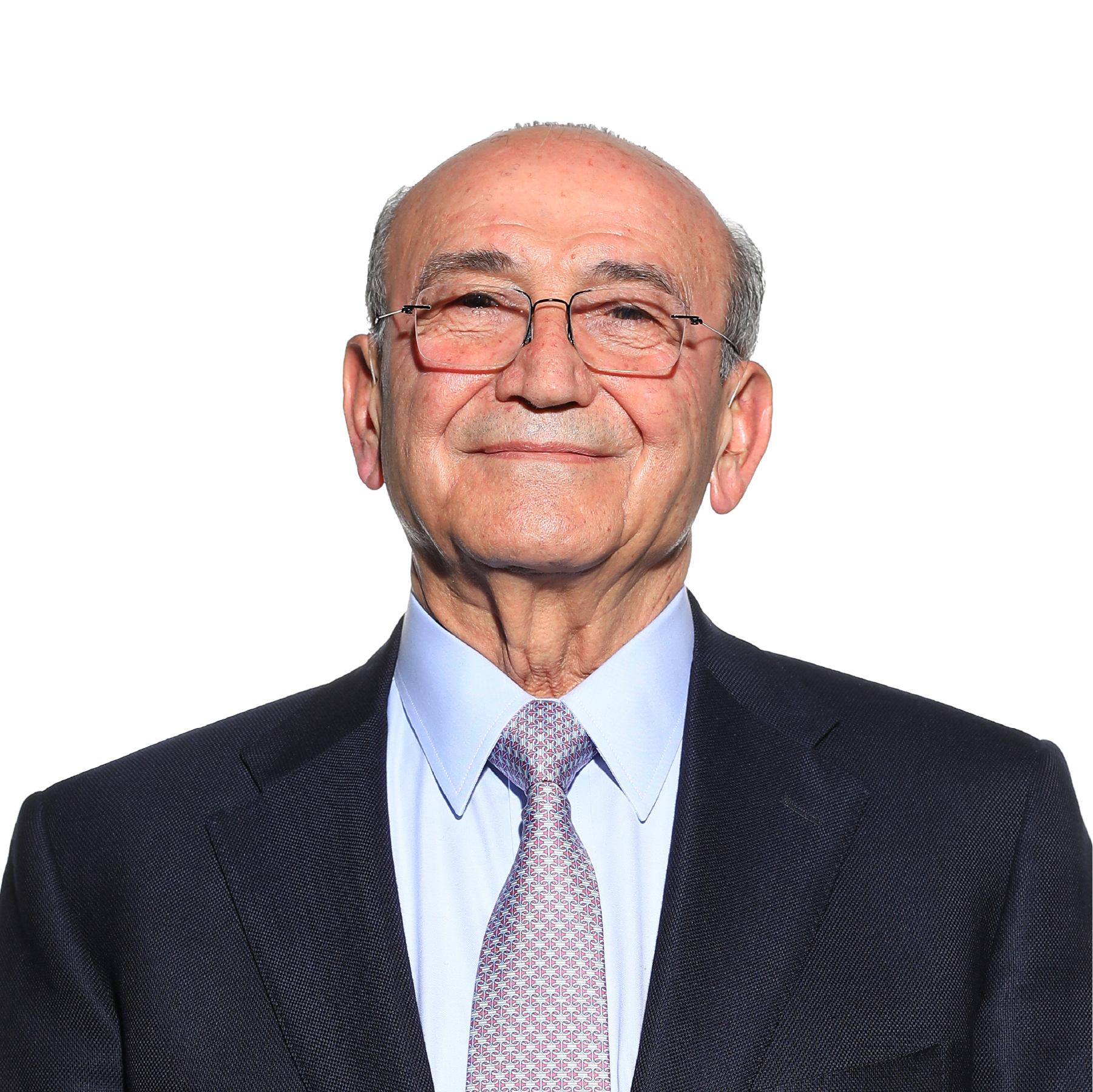
Sabih al Masri

Sabih Taher Darwish al-Masri is a Jordanian-Palestinian businessman. He is the founder and chairman of Arab Supply and Trading Company (Astra Group). He is also the chairman of Zara Investment Holding, Astra Industries, Paltel Corporation and Arab Bank, and a founder of the Palestine Securities Exchange (PSE).

He is the cousin of Munib al-Masri.

Al-Masri has a degree in chemical engineering from the University of Texas.

Al-Masri co-founded Zara Investment Holding in 1994.

Al-Masri was detained on the 16th of December, 2017 in Saudi Arabia
