= Arab National Bank =

Major bank in Saudi Arabia

- Native name: البنك العربي الوطني
- Type: Public (Tadawul: 1080)
- ISIN: SA0007879105
- Industry: Banking; Financial services
- Founded: June 13, 1979; 47 years ago
- Headquarters: Riyadh, Saudi Arabia
- Number of locations: 140 Branches (2018)
- Area served: Saudi Arabia, United Kingdom
- Net income: USD 673 million (2013)
- Total assets: USD 36.8 billion (2013)
- Total equity: USD 5.1 billion (2013)
- Owner: Arab Bank 40 %
- Number of employees: 3,770 (2019)
- Parent: Arab Bank
- Website: anb.com.sa

The Arab National Bank (anb; Arabic: البنك العربي الوطني) is a major bank based in Riyadh, Saudi Arabia and listed on the Saudi Stock Exchange. It is among the top ten largest banks in the Middle East and has received an 'A' rank from Standard and Poor's. It has 156 branches in Saudi Arabia. Its largest shareholder is Arab Bank, holding 40% of the fund.

Arab National Bank was ranked 18th on Forbes Middle East's 30 Most Valuable Banks 2025 list. It also ranked 29th on Forbes Middle East's Top 100 Listed Companies 2025 list.

== History ==
The Arab National Bank traces its origins to a foreign branch of the Arab Bank in Jeddah, which opened in 1949. Although the Saudi and Kuwaiti governments held stakes in the bank, the Arab Bank was not spared the wave of nationalization that saw all foreign-owned banks transferred to local ownership in 1979. One of the founders is Prince Khalid, son of Prince Turki bin Abdulaziz. Early on, both the Governments of Saudi Arabia and Kuwait took on small stakes in anb of about 10% each. Despite this and despite being pan-Arab in its orientation, anb was unable to escape the policy limiting foreign ownership. In 1980, it transferred its six branches to the newly created anb. Arab National had a service agreement with anb that expired in 1988 and was not renewed. Arab Bank owns 40% of the bank and some 5000 Saudi shareholders own 60%. In 2002, the Governments of Saudi Arabia and Kuwait own about 8% of anb between them. anb has opened a branch in London. Its largest shareholder (40%) is Arab Bank and headquartered in Amman, Jordan.

== See also ==
- List of banks in Saudi Arabia
