= Kinnernet =

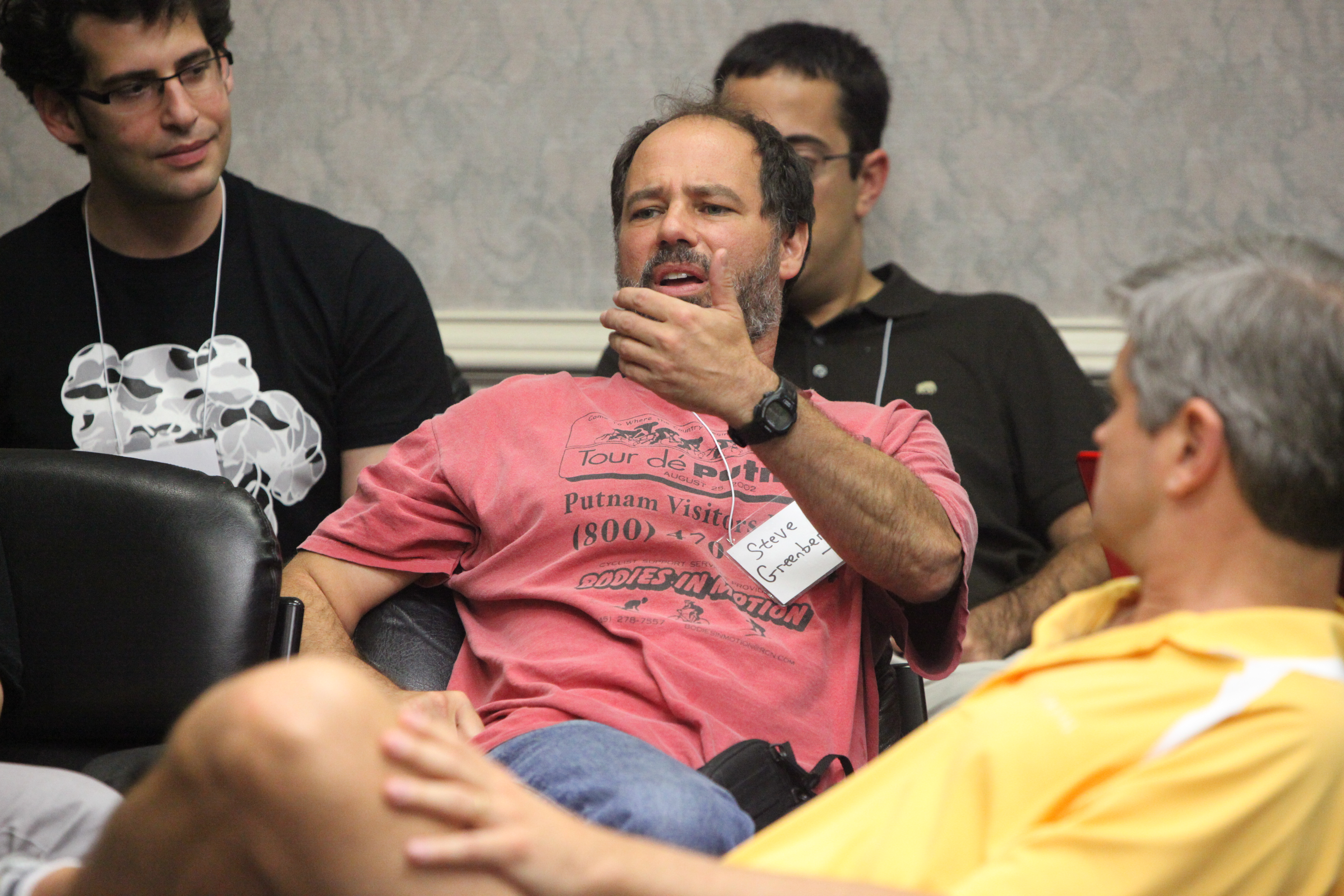
- Record producer Steven Greenberg (center) speaks at Kinnernet on May 9, 2009. AOL founder Steve Case (foreground) observes.
- Status: Active
- Genre: Internet networking Art
- Country: Israel, France, Italy, Portugal, Estonia, Panama, UAE
- Years active: 23
- Founder: Yossi Vardi
- Participants: 100–200 (each event)

Kinnernet is a series of invitation-only unconference events formed by entrepreneurs, technologists, startup founders, scientists, media professionals, and creatives.

== Format ==
Described as "a wild out of the box, irreverent, bottom-up innovation, creativity and cultural unconference", the event gathers each year 100-200 innovators working in the media, art, technology or creative industries, with the mission to: "meet, share our visions and invent desirable futures together".

The festival mixes in depth conversations, debates, workshops, but also creative and artistic moments. All participants are equal and contributors and set up the programme by posting the topics on their minds on large wiki-boards. The Festival aims to create and develop each year innovative and contributive projects.

Forbes described it as follows: "Take the ‘no speakers or topics’ mantra to the extreme and you have the unconference [...] Gather an invitation-only list of fantastic people, give them an empty dry erase board with meeting times and locations and let the magic happen."

== History ==
The first Kinnernet event was held in the spring of 2003, organised by Yossi Vardi, founding investor of ICQ

The conference is invitation-only and self-organized, originally inspired by Tim O'Reilly's Foo Camp.

Some discussion points become topics at TheMarker, a two-day Internet business conference in Tel Aviv.

Since its inception, several Kinnernets chapters have opened throughout the world, including Avallon (France), Venice and Turin (Italy), Alcobaça (Portugal), Vihula Manhor (Estonia), and Ciudad del Saber (Panama).

== Locations ==
- Nes Harim, Israel, since 2003 (link)
- Avallon, France, since 2013 (link)
- Venice, Italy, from 2017 to 2019 and Turin, since 2023 (link; link)
- Alcobaça, Portugal, since 2018 (link)
- Vihula Manor, Estonia, since 2019 (link)
- Ciudad del Saber, Panama, since 2019 (link)
- Dubai, UAE, in 2022 (link)
