= Islamic International Arab Bank =

Jordanian bank

- Type: Financial institution
- Genre: Public Shareholding
- Founded: 1998
- Founder: Abdul Hamid Abdul Majeed Shoman
- Headquarters: Amman, Jordan
- Key people: Abdul Hamid Abdul Majeed Shoman; Iyad Al Asali - General Manager
- Website: Official website

Islamic International Arab Bank is a Jordanian bank that exercises its banking operations in accordance with the provisions of Islamic law in Jordanian, Arab and Islamic countries.

The Islamic International Arab Bank commenced its banking operations in accordance with Islamic Sharia rules on the twelfth day of Shawwal 1418 AH (9 February 1998).

The Islamic International Arab Bank was established in the Hashemite Kingdom of Jordan as a public shareholding company in accordance with the Companies Law of 1989 and the company was registered in the Register of Public Shareholding companies under No. 327 on 30 March 1997.

== See also ==
- Islam in Jordan
