= Palestine Exchange =

Stock exchange located in Nablus, West Bank, Palestine

- Type: Stock exchange
- Location: Nablus, Palestine
- Founded: 1995
- Key people: Nihad Kamal, CPA - General Manager
- Currency: USD, JOD
- Website: www.pex.ps

The Palestine Exchange (PEX; Arabic: بورصة فلسطين, romanized: Būrṣat Filasṭīn) is a stock exchange based in Nablus, Palestine. The PEX was established in 1995 and operates under the supervision of the Palestinian Capital Market Authority (CMA).

As of December 2012, 48 companies were listed on the PEX, with a total market capitalization of about US$3 billion in five main areas: financial services, insurance, investments, industry, and services. Most of the listed companies trade in Jordanian dinars or in US dollars. The PEX is open Sunday to Thursday between 9.45 a.m. and 1 p.m. throughout the year. It is closed on Friday, Saturday, public holidays and the last working day of the fiscal year. About ten stockbroker firms are authorised to place orders and process financial products on the PEX.

The PEX has been a private entity since its founding. As of 2013, only shares had been traded on the PEX, although it supports including other securities. About half of the PEX's investment comes from Palestinian companies, with the other half being from other countries.

== History ==
The Palestine Exchange (PEX) was incorporated as a private shareholding company in early 1995, with the Palestine Development & Investment Company (PADICO) as its major shareholder. The Palestinian Authority (PA) approved the PADICO-sponsored design and work plan in July 1995, and a project team was put together by the PEX to establish a fully electronic exchange and depository. EFA Software Services, a Canadian company, provided both the trading and settlement and clearing systems. By August 1996, the PEX was fully operational, and on 7 November 1996 the PEX signed an operating agreement with the PA, allowing for the licensing and qualification of brokerage firms. On 18 February 1997, the PEX conducted its first trading session. The PEX launched an e-trading portal on 24 April 2007. The PEX is a member of the Federation of Euro-Asian Stock Exchanges (FEAS).

== Regulatory framework ==
In 2005, with the development of the legal structure of the securities sector in Palestine, particularly the issuance of the Securities Law No. (12) of 2004 and the Capital Market Authority Law No. (13) of 2004, the Palestine Capital Market Authority (CMA) took over the supervision of the PEX and issuing securities by public companies.

== See also ==
- List of Mideast stock exchanges
- List of stock exchanges
- List of stock market indices
- Stock exchange
