= USA Act and the Financial Anti-Terrorism Act =

The USA Act and the Financial Anti-Terrorism Act are the legislative precursors to the USA PATRIOT Act.

== USA Act ==
The USA Act (Uniting and Strengthening America Act of 2001) is an expansion of the Foreign Intelligence Surveillance Act (FISA) of 1978.

The primary difference between the USA Act and FISA is the definition of terrorism. In FISA, terrorism is limited to acts that are "backed by a foreign power." The phrase "foreign power" is commonly interpreted to refer to a foreign government. Focus on Al Qaeda after September 11 raised the issue that there are terrorists who are not backed by a foreign government and even those who may act completely alone. In the USA Act, terrorism was redefined to be activity that appears to be intended to (1) intimidate or coerce the government or civil population AND (2) breaks criminal laws AND (3) endangers human life.

== Financial Anti-Terrorism Act ==
The Financial Anti-Terrorism Act of 2001 (H.R. 3004) was a bill calling for the Federal Government to have the increased ability to control and monitor financial criminals and the ability to sentence them.

The Financial Anti-Terrorism Act allows:

- Criminals to be punished, those who were engaged in illegal money practices
- Gives procedural guidelines for Federal subpoenas for records of funds in correspondent bank accounts
- Federal jurisdiction over foreign money launderers and over money laundered through a foreign bank
- All financial institutions to be forced to form an anti-money laundering program

== Legislative history: combining into the USA PATRIOT Act ==
The USA Act passed the House (H.R. 2975) on October 12, 2001, and by the Senate (S. 1510) on October 11, 2001.

On October 17, 2001 the Financial Anti-Terrorism Act passed the House of Representatives: 412-1. The only Representative to vote "Nay" was Ron Paul.

The USA Act and the Financial Anti-Terrorism Act were combined to become the USA PATRIOT Act on October 26, 2001.
