= Yossi Vardi =

Israeli entrepreneur and investor (born 1942)

- יוסי ורדי
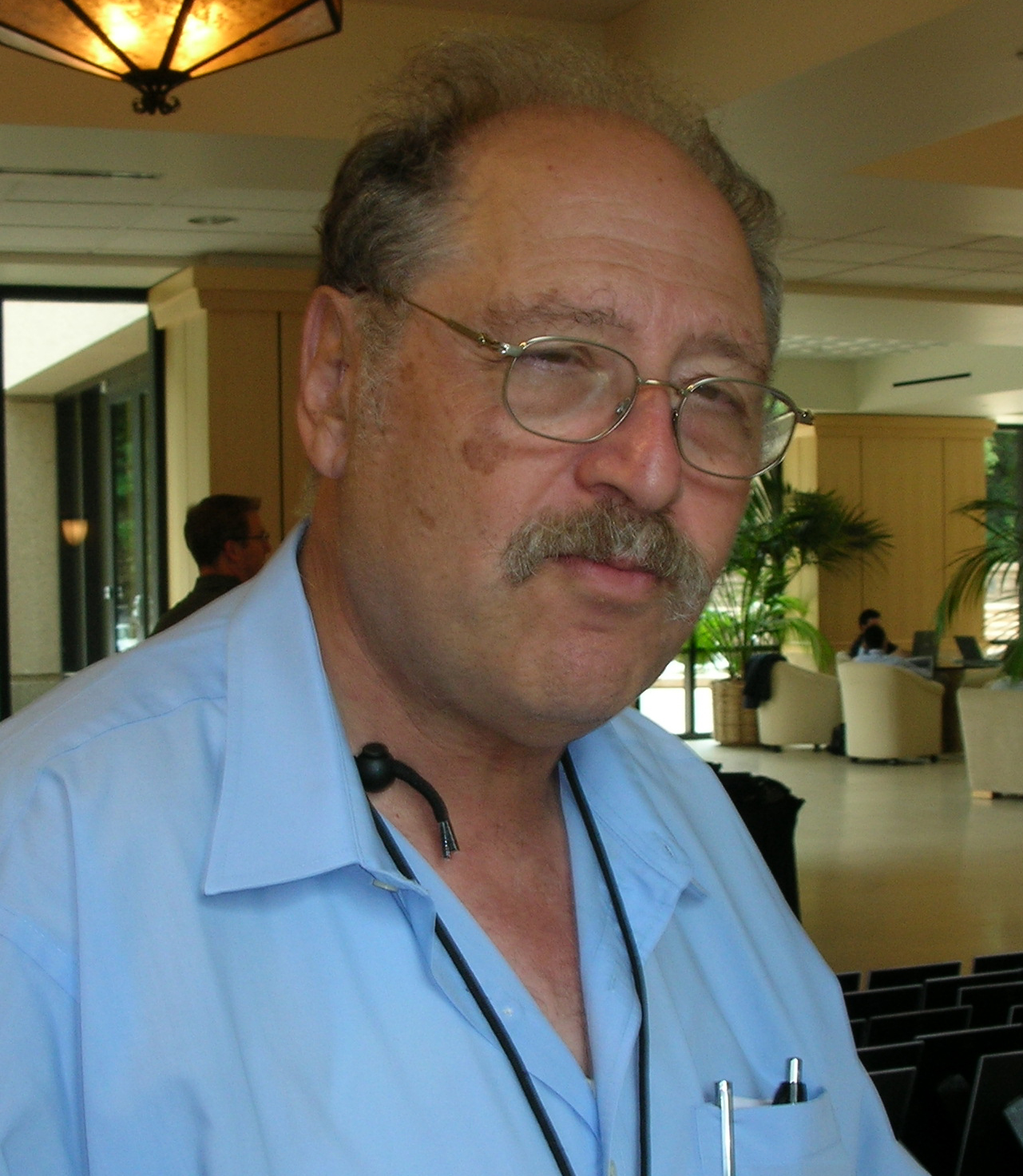
- Vardi in 2005
- Born: September 2, 1942 (age 83); Tel Aviv, Mandatory Palestine
- Citizenship: Israeli
- Education: Technion (B. Sc. in industrial management engineering, M. Sc. in Operations Research, D. Sc.)
- Occupations: Entrepreneur, investor
- Spouse: Talma
- Children: Arik Vardi (co-founder of ICQ), Oded, and Dani

Joseph "Yossi" Vardi (Hebrew: יוסף "יוסי" ורדי; born September 2, 1942) is an Israeli entrepreneur and investor. He is known for his involvement in the early development of Israel's high-tech sector and the Israeli internet industry. He has been involved in the founding and development of over 85 high-tech companies across various fields, including software, energy, internet, mobile, electro-optics, and water technology, over a span of more than 47 years.

== Personal life ==
Joseph Vardi was born in Tel Aviv. He studied at the Technion in Haifa, graduating with a B.Sc. in industrial management engineering. He went on to earn an M.Sc. in Operations Research and a D.Sc. (his thesis received the Kennedy-Leigh Award).

He is married to Talma and the father of Arik (co-founder of ICQ), Oded, and Dani.

== Career ==
Vardi began his entrepreneurial career in 1969, at the age of 26, as co-founder and first CEO of TEKEM (Hebrew: טכ"מ), an abbreviation of 'Technologia Mitkademet'.

He was appointed as the Director of the Investment Authority in North America and Consul for Economic Affairs at the Israeli Consulate in New York. In this role, he contributed to the establishment of the Israel-U.S. Binational Industrial Research and Development Foundation (BIRD-F) and served as an advisor to the Israeli mission to the U.N.

Upon returning to Israel, he served as the first Director General of the Ministry of Energy. Vardi also chaired the Israel National Oil Company, and was a member of the board of Oil Refineries Ltd. During his tenure, Israel discovered and developed oil fields in the Gulf of Suez. Vardi co-founded Alon oil, International Laser Technologies, Granite Hacarmel and other companies. Vardi is a co-holder of a patent on instant messaging on telephones.

=== Investment strategy ===
Vardi is an early stage "angel". Since 1996 he has been active in founding young internet companies and internet startups. In 1996 he became the founding investor of Mirabilis (company) – the creator of ICQ, which is the first instant messaging application that was released to the web. Among the companies he invested in, or helped to build are Answers.com (went public), Gteko (sold to Microsoft), Airlink (sold to Sierra Wireless), Tivella (sold to Cisco), Scopus (went public), CTI2 (sold to Audiocodes), Foxytunes (sold to yahoo), Tucows (went public), wibiya (sold to Conduit), The Gift Project (sold to eBay), Epals (went public), and Starnet (sold to IAC/InterActiveCorp). Among his other investments are: Come2Play (a social gaming site), Fring, speedbit, Cellogic (developer of a content discovery platform for mobile publishers, and of the deeplink.me mobile deep linking platform), BloggersBase (a discovery platform for premium UGC), Wefi and many others. Mirabilis, which practically had no revenues, was sold to AOL just 19 months after it released its product for over 400 million dollars. The sale inspired a whole generation of young Israelis to open start ups. According to Forbes: "...Overnight, a new phrase "the Mirabilis Effect," became popular as young Israeli entrepreneurs yearned to copy the company's success".

After retiring from the civil service, Vardi served on the boards of Amdocs, Maariv, Elite, Scitex, Bezeq, Arkia, Elisra, Hamashbir Hamerkazi and others, and assisted Ormat Industries to identify and develop its geothermal activity. He is a member of Amdocs advisory committee.

=== Cultivating Culture of Innovation and Creativity ===
In recent years Vardi is active in fostering a culture of innovation and creativity in Israel and abroad. He founded Kinnernet, an annual, three days gathering of creative people from all over the world at the shores of the Sea of Gallilee; he is the chairman of 4YFN (4 Years from Now), the startup event organized by Mobile World Capital Barcelona; together with Dr Hubert Burda he is co-chairing the annual DLD (Digital, Lifestyle, Design) conference in Munich; together with Sir Martin Sorrell he is co-chairing the annual Stream unconference in Greece, he also co-hosting ICUC – (Internet Cowboys UnConference) in Jackson Hole, Wyoming. He talks about this heavily in the Shaping Business Minds Through Art Podcast. He is also Chairman of Volcano Summit, ecosystem building platform of Latam.

=== Public sector ===
After leaving the government, Vardi continued to be involved in the public sector. He is the co-chair of the European Union – Israel Strategic Business Dialogue. He chaired a number of government-appointed commissions and committees, among them the Public Commission for the Regulation of the Electricity Sector, the Public Commission on Raising Venture Capital in the Stock Exchange and others. He also took part in the formation of Yozma. He served on the Advisory Council of the Bank of Israel, and israel Securities Authority, and on the board of directors of the Development Corporation for Israel (State of Israel Bonds). He serves on the board of governors of the Technion. He was the chairman of the Jerusalem Foundation, was member of the council and the executive committee of the Open University of Israel and the board of trustees of the Hebrew University and Weizmann Institute.

=== Peace negotiations ===
In his capacity as the Director General of the Ministry of Energy, Vardi led the negotiations in regards to the oil part in the peace agreement with Egypt. While in the private sector Vardi was asked to serve as special advisor to the Ministers of Foreign Affairs and Finance, for regional cooperation, and to head the economic negotiations with Jordan. He also participated in the multi-lateral talks with the Palestinians, and served on the Israeli delegation to the Wye Plantation talks with the Syrians.

In 2013, Vardi was one of a group of Israeli and Palestinian business figures who launched Breaking the Impasse (BTI), a forum in favor of advancing a diplomatic solution. BTI is supported by the World Economic Forum.

=== International activities ===
Vardi acted as an advisor to the World Bank and the United Nations Development Program on issues of energy policy and strategy in the developing world. He is a member of the World Economic Forum, serves as an advisor on Middle-Eastern economic affairs to the Conference of Presidents of Major American Jewish Organizations. and on the Future Trends Forum of The Bankinter Foundation of Innovation. He serves on the advisory board of Blackberry Ventures, and served on the Research Visionary Board of Motorola, and on the advisory board of 3i, was advisor to the CEOs of AOL, Amazon.com, Allied-signal, Siemens-Albis and others.

== Awards ==
Vardi was selected by Wall Street Journal Europe for "Tech's Top 25", and won the TechCrunch Europe 2009 "Best investor personality" award. He received an Honorary Doctorate from the Technion and from Ben Gurion University, Honorary Fellowship from the Open University, twice received the Prime Minister Award for life achievements in the high tech area; the Industry Award, for his contribution to the development Israel's industry; the 1998 entrepreneur of the year, the 2010 Excellence in Global Entrepreneurship and Management Award, and the Hugo Ramniceanu prize for Economics, all from Tel Aviv University. He received the Heim Herzog prize for unique contribution to the state of Israel from the Hebrew University and the President Herzog Foundation. He also received the CEO's Entrepreneurs Hall of Fame from the Collegiate Entrepreneurs' Organization, and a Certificate of Merit for the pioneering of the software industry and Information Technology from the Israel Chamber of System Analysts, as well as the Innovation Leadership Medal from the European Alliance for Innovation.

He was nominated as one of The Most Influential International Executives by The Industry Standard, cited by Haaretz newspaper as one of the 50 "persons of the decade" for the first decade of the 2000s, was elected by Israel 21c to the top 10 icons of Israeli high tech - the pioneers, by The Algemeiner for the "Jewish 100 - the top 100 people positively influenced Jewish life" and by Wired magazine as number 9 of the Wired 2014 top 100.

In 2025, President Isaac Herzog's office named Vardi among the nine recipients of the Presidential Medal of Honour.

== Published works ==
- International Herald Tribune: An Alternative Voice: Studios and Networks Just Don't Get It, 2001
- Partnership in Development 1998
- Co-author of Electric Energy Generation: Economics, Reliability and Rates, published by MIT Press
- The Annals Of Improbable Research: Snails Are Faster Than ADSL
- Variable Load Pricing in the Face of Loss of Load Probability, by Joseph Vardi, Jacob Zahavi, and Benjamin Avi-Itzhak. Rand Journal Of Economics, Spring 1977 (Volume 8-1), pages 270–288
- A unified approach to support planning decisions in electrical power generating systems / von Jacob Zahavi; Joseph Vardi and Benjamin Avi-Itzhak In: Energy policy. – Amsterdam : North-Holland Publ. Co., ISBN 0-444-85238-7. – 1978, S. 129–145

== See also ==
- Silicon Wadi
- Science and technology in Israel
