= List of companies of Jordan =

Location of Jordan

Jordan is an Arab kingdom in Western Asia, on the East Bank of the Jordan River. Jordan is classified as a country of "high human development" with an "upper middle income" economy. The Jordanian economy, one of the smallest economies in the region, is attractive to foreign investors based upon a skilled workforce. The country is a major tourist destination, and also attracts medical tourism due to its well developed health sector. Nonetheless, a lack of natural resources, large flow of refugees and regional turmoil have crippled economic growth.

== Notable firms ==
This list includes notable companies with primary headquarters located in the country. The industry and sector follow the Industry Classification Benchmark taxonomy. Organizations which have ceased operations are included and noted as defunct.

Notable companies Status: P=Private, S=State; A=Active, D=Defunct
Name	Industry	Sector	Headquarters	Founded	Notes	Status	
ABS network	Consumer services	Broadcasting & entertainment	Amman	1993	Broadcasting	P	A
Al Khalidi Medical Center	Health care	Health care providers	Amman	1978	Specialty hospital	P	A
Amman Stock Exchange	Financials	Investment services	Amman	1999	Primary exchange	P	A
Aqaba Railway Corporation	Industrials	Railroads	Aqaba	1979	Railway	P	A
Arab Bank	Financials	Banks	Amman	1930	Consumer and commercial bank. Market cap ≈ 4.34B JOD; Revenue ≈ 2.15B JOD	P	A
Arab Bridge Maritime	Industrials	Marine transportation	Aqaba	1985	Commercial transport	P	A
Arab Jordan Investment Bank	Financials	Banks	Amman	1978	Commercial banking. Market cap ≈ 0.22B JOD; Revenue ≈ 0.14B JOD	P	A
Arab Medical Center	Health care	Health care providers	Amman	1994	Medical center	P	A
Bank of Jordan	Financials	Banks	Amman	1960	Bank. Market cap ≈ 0.53B JOD; Revenue ≈ 0.16B JOD	P	A
Arab Potash Company	Basic materials	Chemicals & mining	Amman	1956	Potash mining. Market cap ≈ 2.90B JOD; Revenue ≈ 0.66B JOD	P	A
Cairo Amman Bank	Financials	Banks	Amman	1960	Bank. Market cap ≈ 0.29B JOD; Revenue ≈ 0.14B JOD	P	A
Central Bank of Jordan	Financials	Banks	Amman	1964	State-owned central bank	S	A
Fine Hygienic Holding	Consumer goods	Nondurable products	Amman	1958	Paper towel	P	A
Islamic International Arab Bank	Financials	Banks	Amman	1998	Islamic bank	P	A
Jordan Ahli Bank	Financials	Banks	Amman	1955	Bank. Market cap ≈ 0.26B JOD; Revenue ≈ 0.11B JOD	P	A
Jordan Insurance Company	Financials	Full line insurance	Amman	1951	Insurance. Market cap ≈ 0.03B JOD; Revenue ≈ 0.09B JOD	P	A
Jordan Kuwait Bank	Financials	Banks	Amman	1976	Bank. Market cap ≈ 0.47B JOD; Revenue ≈ 0.34B JOD	P	A
Jordan Petroleum Refinery Company	Oil & gas	Exploration & production	Zarqa	1956	Refinery. Publicly listed; Market cap & revenue available on ASE	P	A
Jordan Phosphate Mines	Basic materials	Specialty chemicals	Amman	1953	Phosphates, fertilizers, chemicals. Market cap ≈ 6.40B JOD; Revenue ≈ 1.26B JOD	P	A
Jordan Radio and Television Corporation (JRTV)	Consumer services	Broadcasting & entertainment	Amman	1985	State broadcaster	S	A
Jordan Telecom Group	Telecommunications	Fixed line telecommunications	Amman	1997	Telecommunication services	P	A
King Hussein Cancer Center	Health care	Health care providers	Amman	1997	Medical center	P	A
King Hussein International Airport	Industrials	Transportation services	Aqaba	1972	Airport	P	A
Logistaas	Software services	Transportation management system provider	Amman	2015	Software services	P	A
Mecca Mall	Consumer services	Broadline retailers	Amman	2003	Shopping mall	P	A
Queen Alia International Airport	Industrials	Transportation services	Amman	1983	Airport	P	A
Royal Jordanian	Consumer services	Airlines	Amman	1963	Airline	P	A
Rubicon Group Holding	Consumer services	Broadcasting & entertainment	Amman	1994	Educational media	P	A
Talal Abu-Ghazaleh Organization	Industrials	Business support services	Amman	1972	Project management, consulting, accounting	P	A
Umniah	Telecommunications	Mobile telecommunications	Amman	2005	Mobile operator; revenue per Batelco/parent group, market cap not standalone listed	P	A

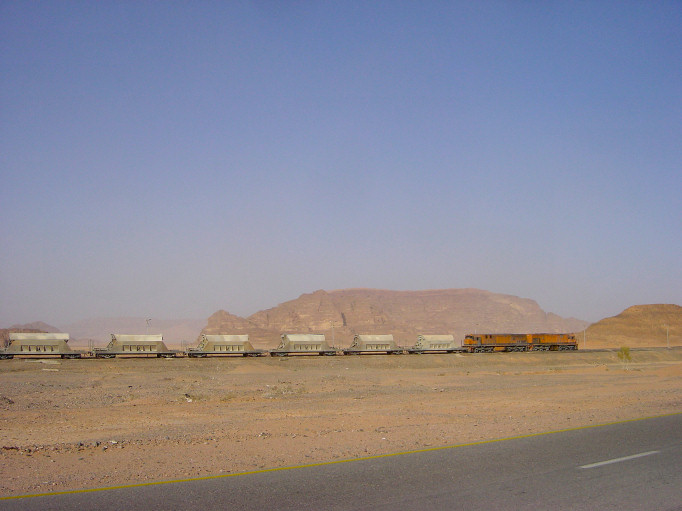
A phosphate train near Ma'an.

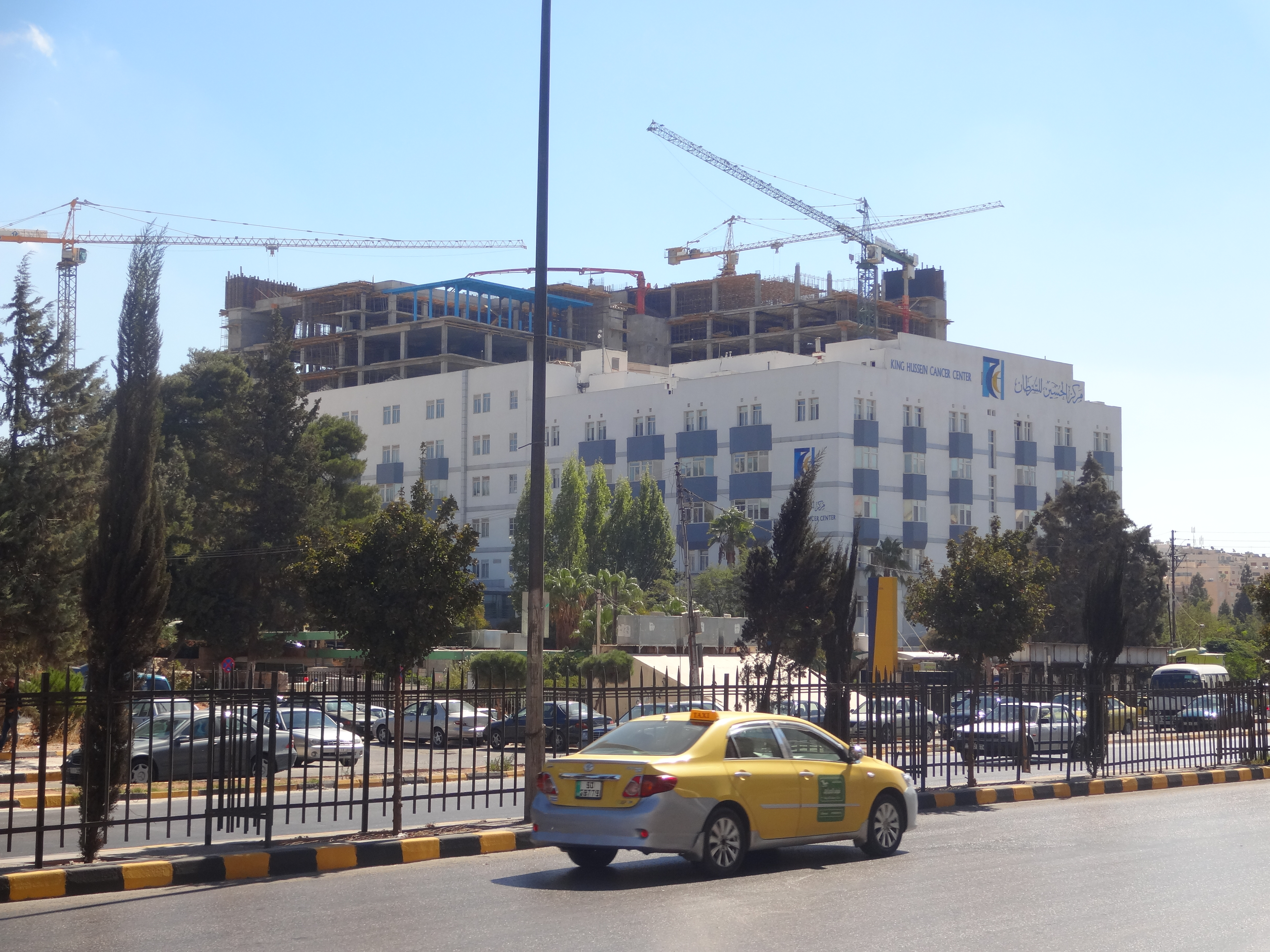
King Hussein Cancer Center in Amman.
