= Darwazah =

Darwazah is a surname. Notable people with the surname include:

- Said Darwazah (born 1957), Jordanian businessman, son of Samih
- Samih Darwazah (1930–2015), Jordanian businessman
