= Arab Pharmaceutical Manufacturing =

- Company type: Public company
- Industry: Healthcare
- Founded: 1962
- Defunct: 2007
- Fate: Acquired
- Successor: Hikma Pharmaceuticals
- Headquarters: Amman, Jordan
- Key people: Issam Hamdi Saket (Managing Director)
- Products: Pharmaceuticals
- Website: www.apm.com.jo

The Arab Pharmaceutical Manufacturing Company (APM) was a Jordanian pharmaceuticals and healthcare company based in Amman. It was acquired by Hikma Pharmaceuticals in 2007.

== History ==
APM was founded in 1962 and it operated two main production facilities, in Al Salalem and Al-Buhayra. APM produced dozens of pharmaceutical products. The company was acquired by Hikma Pharmaceuticals in 2007, but continued to operate under the APM brand until 2017.

While it was operating, APM was listed on the Amman Stock Exchange's ASE Weighted Index.

== Operations ==
As well as supplying the local market in Jordan, APM was active in the export market and exported medicines to Saudi Arabia, Europe and the United States. The company worked with various international partners, including Japan's Takeda Pharmaceutical Company.
