= Chlorine (disambiguation) =

Chlorine is a chemical element with symbol Cl and atomic number 17.

Chlorine may also refer to:

== Arts, entertainment, and media ==
=== Films ===
- Chlorine (2013 film), an American film
- Chlorine (2015 film), an Italian film

=== Music ===
- "Chlorine" (song), a 2018 song by Twenty One Pilots
- "Chlorine" (Title Fight song), a 2014 song by Title Fight
- "Chlorine", a 2016 song by Trophy Eyes from the album Chemical Miracle

== Other uses ==
- Chlorine acid
- Chlorine bleach
- Dichlorine (Cl_{2}), an allotrope of chlorine
- Isotopes of chlorine

== See also ==
- Chlorin, a porphyrine derivative that does not possess any chlorine atoms
- Cl (disambiguation)
