= Jordan–Syria relations =

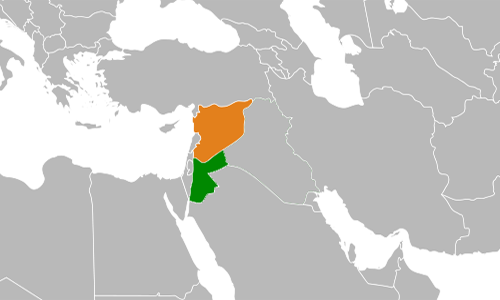

- Jordan: Syria

Jordan–Syria relations are bilateral relations between the sovereign states of Jordan and Syria. Relations between neighbours have ancient roots as both countries are historically parts of the Levant or the region of Syria. The two states were created after the First World War from former Ottoman dominions by way of a secret bilateral agreement between Britain and France.

== History ==
=== Proposals to unify Jordan and Syria ===
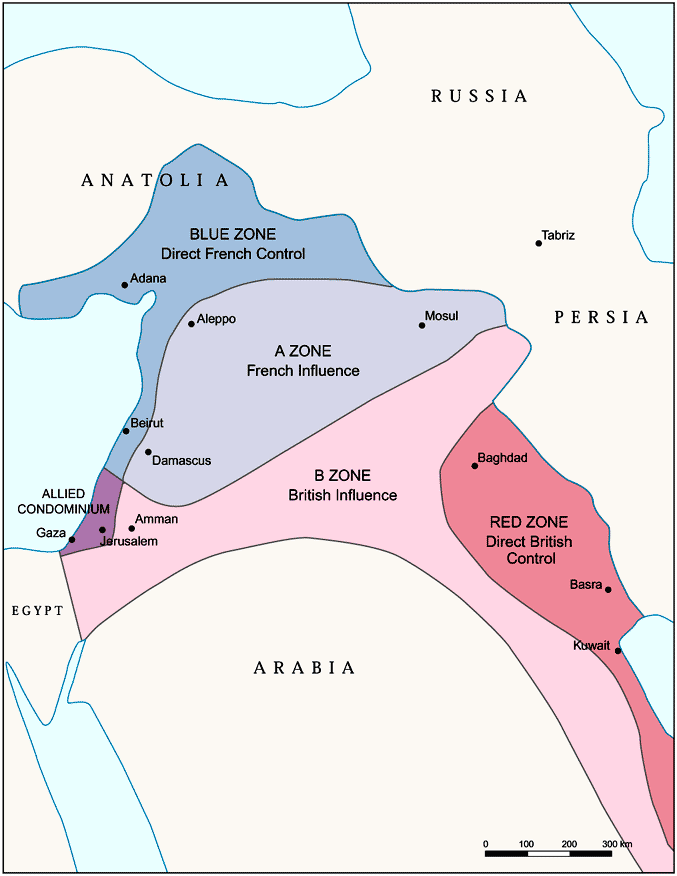
Zones of French and British influence and control established by the Sykes-Picot Agreement of 1916

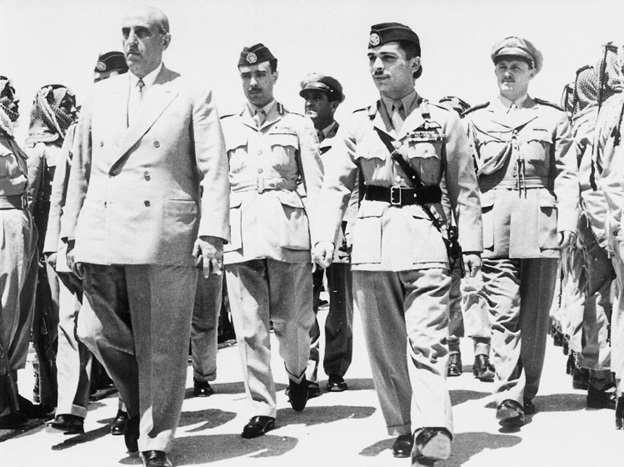
King Hussein (forefront right) inspecting Jordanian troops with Syrian President Shukri al-Quwatli. Walking behind them is Jordanian Chief of Staff Ali Abu Nuwar in 1956.

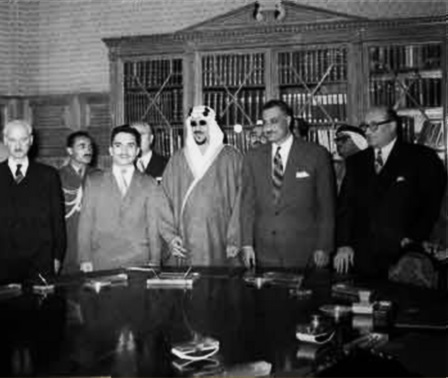
The signing of the Arab Defense Pact between Egypt, Saudi Arabia, Syria and Jordan in Cairo, Egypt. From left to right at the forefront: Jordanian Prime Minister Suleiman Nabulsi, Jordanian King Hussein, Saudi King Saud, Egyptian President Gamal Abdel Nasser and Syrian Prime Minister Sabri al-Asali, 19 January 1957

=== Ba'athist era ===
In the late 1960s, tensions between the Hashemite Kingdom of Jordan and Ba'athist Syria were exacerbated, following the rift between Jordan and the PLO, with Syria supporting the Palestinians against Jordan. In September 1970, during the full-blown military hostilities between Jordan and the PLO known as Black September, Syria sent an armored division into Jordan to reinforce the Palestinian forces under attack by Hussein's army. By July 1971, Syria had broken off diplomatic relations with Jordan over the issue.

The October 1973 War against Israel resulted in a gradual improvement in relations, as Jordan contributed to the Syrian military effort; however, another break between Syria and Jordan occurred in 1977, following Jordan's tacit support for Egyptian President Sadat's peace initiative. During this period Syria charged Jordan with harboring members of the Muslim Brotherhood, who had escaped from Syria.

=== During the Syrian Civil War ===
==== 2010s ====
In 2012, relations became somewhat strained due to the Syrian civil war; reports emerged of Jordanian forces clashing with Syrian forces along the border.

Jordan unofficially came out against the government of Bashar al-Assad in Syria (an ally of Iran), considering Iranian long-term presence in Syria as a threat to its security. Jordan was also alleged to have been working with Saudi Arabia, Russia, and Israel in an attempt to curb Iranian involvement in Syria.

On 28 July 2012, Jordan opened the Zaatari refugee camp east of Mafraq to host Syrian refugees.

On 30 April 2014, the Azraq refugee camp opened near Azraq.

On 26 May 2014, Jordan expelled Syrian ambassador Bahjat Suleiman who, according to the Jordanian Foreign Ministry spokeswoman, was declared persona non grata because of "continued offensive statements, through his personal contacts or writing in the media and the social media, against the kingdom."

Jordan is part of the American-led intervention in Syria, and has established a "special working mechanism" to coordinate its involvement there with the Russian military intervening in the civil war on Assad's side.

Although Jordan initially supported the moderate rebel coalition known as the Southern Front, it later pressured the United States to freeze the CIA's armament support for them. Jordan is said to support the Revolutionary Commando Army, but has stated the objective of that group is to fight the Islamic State of Iraq and the Levant (ISIS), not the Syrian government.

==== 2020s ====
On 19 July 2021, US president Joe Biden met with Jordanian king Abdullah II and discussed, among other things, the future of the Syrian crisis. In that meeting King Abdullah suggested Biden cooperate with Russia and the Government of Syria to help stabilize Syria and restore Syrian sovereignty and unity.

On 3 October 2021, King Abdullah II held a telephone conversation with Syrian president Bashar al-Assad, the first contact since the start of the Syrian civil war. They discussed bilateral relations after Amman fully opened borders with Syria.

In February 2023, after the 2023 Turkey-Syria earthquake, Jordan provided urgent medical and humanitarian aid to Syria. The Jordan Armed Forces-Arab Army delivered rescue equipment, tents, medical supplies and food. In addition, the Jordanian Foreign Minister Ayman Safadi visited Damascus for the first time since the start of the Syrian Civil War.

=== Post-Assad regime relations ===
Following the fall of the Assad regime in December 2024, Jordanian Foreign Minister Ayman Safadi met in Damascus with de facto Syrian leader Ahmed al-Sharaa stating: "We stand by our Syrian brothers as they start the rebuilding process".

Syrian foreign minister Asaad Hassan al-Shibani made an official visit to Jordan on 7 January 2025 where both countries agreed to form a joint security committee to counter smuggling across their common border.

Bilateral relations saw a new phase on 26 February 2025, when Jordan's King Abdullah met Syrian President al-Sharaa in Amman. The leaders agreed to strengthen border security to combat arms and drug smuggling, a persistent issue during Bashar al-Assad’s rule. Jordan has blamed pro-Iranian militias for the problem, and Sharaa pledged to address it. The meeting followed Israeli airstrikes in Syria, which Jordan condemned. Sharaa, who led the offensive that ousted Assad, has been engaging with regional powers, including Saudi Arabia and Turkey. Jordan supports Syria's political transition and has offered assistance in rebuilding efforts, including energy supplies.

In July 2025, Jordan and Syria have agreed to fairly share water from the Yarmouk River after talks at the Wihdeh Dam. They signed a deal to monitor water use together and fix problems like illegal wells. Jordan plans to try cloud seeding to increase rainfall, and Syria offered to give Jordan extra water this summer. Both sides called the talks positive and a step toward better regional cooperation.

In October 2025, Syria and Jordan's anti-narcotics directives published a joint statement where they announced the seizure of one million narcotics pills intended for smuggling, and arrested several suspects. Later that year, on 24–25 December, Jordan carried out airstrikes against drug and arms smuggling networks in the southern and eastern parts of Sweida Governorate, southern Syria, targeting storage sites, workshops and traffickers near the border as part of its ongoing campaign to curb cross-border narcotics trafficking.

== See also ==
- Foreign relations of Jordan
- Foreign relations of Syria
- Jordan–Syria border
- Syrians in Jordan
- Battle of Maysalun (1920) between Syria and France
- Bilad ash-Sham or Greater Syria
- Fertile Crescent Plan
- Levant Quartet (2010), economic & cultural partnership between Turkey, Lebanon, Syria, and Jordan
- Sykes-Picot Agreement: UK and France plan spheres of influence in Levant during WWI
