= Munira Shaʻban =

Jordanian midwife

Munira Shaʻban (Arabic: منيرة شعبان) is a Jordanian midwife who pioneered education on family planning and maternal health in Jordan.

== Life ==
Sha'ban began studying nursing when she was 15 years old. Later on, she specialized in midwifery. She continued her studies in London; when she returned to Jordan, she pioneered the family planning education in the country. She co-wrote a textbook for new midwives, trained others and gave lectures on midwifery. She also helped develop an ethics for midwives.

Sha'ban, affectionately known as Mama Munira, was the first midwife working in the Zaatari refugee camp. She worked through the Jordan Health Aid, on a UNFPA mission. In 2014, she took part in a high-level event at the Headquarters of the United Nations, invited by the then-general secretary Ban Ki-moon, to explain and talk about her work on maternal health and family planning in Jordan and the surrounding region. Other participants included former Tanzanian president Jakaya Kikwete. Munira Sha'ban has also taken part in a televised health show.

After retiring, she has supported and counseled Syrian pregnant refugees.
