= JPMC =

JPMC may refer to:

- Jerudong Park Medical Centre, Bruneian private specialist hospital
- Jinnah Postgraduate Medical Centre, hospital in Karachi, Pakistan
- Jordan Phosphate Mines, Jordanese mining company
- JPMorgan Chase, American banking corporation
