= Mohammad Ali Bdeir =

Jordanian Businessman and Politician

- Born: 1909; Ottoman Empire
- Died: 1997 (Aged 88); Amman, Jordan
- Occupation: Jordanian Industrialist
- Children: 5

Mohammad Ali Bdeir (Arabic: محمد علي بدير; born 1909) was a Jordanian businessman, industrialist, and politician of Damascene descent. He played a central role in the early economic and infrastructural development of the Emirate of Transjordan and later the Hashemite Kingdom of Jordan. He is best known for founding the Jordan Electric Power Company in 1938, which introduced electric power to Amman.

== Early life ==
Bdeir was born in Damascus, Ottoman Empire, in 1909. His father was among the early merchants who relocated from Damascus to Amman prior to the establishment of the Emirate of Transjordan. In 1916, the family settled in Amman, then a small Ottoman settlement along the Hejaz Railway. Bdeir later continued his education in Damascus and Beirut, where he obtained his secondary school certificate.

== Business Career ==
Bdeir began his commercial career in 1927, establishing the Transjordan Building Materials Company, one of the first registered private enterprises in Amman. The firm supplied cement, steel, and timber for construction in the new Emirate.

In 1938, he founded the Jordan Electric Power Company (then the Amman Electricity Company) with a capital of 2,500 Jordanian dinars. The company built the city’s first diesel-powered generation plant, replacing kerosene lighting and supplying electricity to several hundred homes and institutions. Its network then reached Zarqa, Ruseifa, and Salt, initiating large-scale electrification in Jordan.

Following the success of the Electric Company Bdeir later co-founded and invested in major national enterprises, including the:

- Jordan Phosphate Mines Company (est. 1949)
- Jordan Petroleum Refinery Company (est. 1956)
- Jordan Cement Company
- Jordan Insurance Company (est. 1951)
- Arab Airways Company (est. 1950)
- Jordan Marble and Alabaster Company
- Jordan Tobacco and Cigarette Company

Bdeir was elected to the Amman Chamber of Commerce in 1933 and later held positions including secretary, vice president, and president.

== Politics and public life ==
Bdeir was elected to the Jordanian Parliament in 1951. He also served in the Senate and the National Consultative Council. A hall at the University of Jordan, along with streets and schools, are named in his honor.
