= Jordan Insurance Company =

Jordan Insurance Company plc
- Type: Public company
- Traded as: XAMM:JOIN
- Industry: Insurance
- Founded: 1951; 75 years ago
- Founder: Mohammad Ali Bdeir
- Headquarters: Amman, Jordan
- Key people: Imad Abdel Khaleq (General Manager); Othman Bdeir (Chairman)
- Products: Insurance services
- Number of employees: 234 (2024)
- Website: www.jicjo.com

Jordan Insurance Company (Arabic: شركة التأمين الاردنية) is a Jordanian insurance company based in Amman.

The company is listed on the Amman Stock Exchange's ASE Weighted Index with the symbol "JOIN". 10% of the company's stock is owned by Munich Re, a reinsurance company from Germany.

== The Insurance Building ==
The company’s headquarters, known locally as the Insurance Building, is one of Amman’s landmark modernist structures and was once the city’s tallest tower. Construction began in the 1950s and finished in 1961. Initiated by the Syrian Bdeir family as a symbol of modernization and progress for the Jordan Insurance Company, it marked Amman’s first high-rise.

Designed by Lebanese architect Khalil Khoury, influenced by Modernism, the Bauhaus movement, and early Brutalist architecture, the building showcases mid-century innovation in Jordan. Its three interlocking volumes—a glazed office wing, a vertical circulation core, and a podium integrated into the slope—form a composition that engages the city’s topography.

The structure remains an icon of Amman’s mid-20th-century architectural and economic transformation.
