= Jordan Ceramic Industries =

Company

- Company type: Public company
- Traded as: Previously XAMM:JOCF
- Industry: Manufacturing
- Founded: 1966
- Defunct: c. 2015
- Fate: Closed
- Headquarters: Zarqa, Amman, Jordan
- Key people: Mamdouh Abu-Hassan, Chairman
- Products: Tiles, toilets, sinks, and showers
- Number of employees: 475 (2015)

Jordan Ceramic Industries was a Jordanian manufacturing company based in Amman. The company produced floor and wall tiles, and vitreous sanitary ware, i.e. toilets, sinks and showers. The company stopped production in 2015 and was the target of a failed acquisition for the development of its sizable industrial land.

== History ==
It was founded in 1966 and was based in Zarka and Amman. It operated 3 factories and produces 2.5 million square meters of tile and 4,000 tons of sanitary ware per year.

The stock of Jordan Ceramic was listed on the Amman Stock Exchange's ASE Weighted Index.

In 2015 the company had stopped production and was the merger target of Specialised Investment Compounds (SPIC), a Jordanian real estate company. The merger was canceled by SPIC.
