= UAIC =

UAIC may refer to

- Alexandru Ioan Cuza University, Romanian: Universitatea "Alexandru Ioan Cuza"
- United Auburn Indian Community
- Ticker symbol of United Arab Investors
