= Petro Jordan Abadi =

Indonesian company

PT Petro Jordan Abadi is an Indonesian company that is a joint venture between Jordan Phosphate Mine Co. Plc. with Indonesian company, Petrokimia Gresik. The company plans to be the biggest phosphate manufacturer in Indonesia.

The new plant was expected to be completed on 9 July 2014 with a producing capacity of 200,000 tons phosphoric acid, 600,000 tons sulfuric acid and 500,000 tons gypsum granulation per year.
