= ASE Market Capitalization Weighted Index =

Jordanian stock market index

The ASE Market Capitalization Weighted Index is a stock index of the Amman Stock Exchange in Jordan. The ASE Weighted Index is one of two principal stock indices on the exchange, the other being the ASE Unweighted Price Index.

The ASE Unweighted Index was created in 1980 and was very successful. The ASE went on to create a weighted index in 1992. The weighted index, whose constituents are listed below, attaches a value to each stock price based on the total market capitalisation of each stock; that is, the total amount of money the stock is worth on the stock market. The Unweighted Index calculates an index value based on the price alone.

== Index listings ==
Both the weighted and unweighted indices use the same list of stocks. The constituents of the ASE indices are evaluated each year. The 70 stocks listed here are the 2007 version of the index. They are categorized by sector: banking sector, insurance sector, service sector and industrial sector. The lists are alphabetized by stock symbol.

== Banking sector ==
| Symbol | Company | Notes |
|---|---|---|
| ABCO | Bank ABC Jordan | |
| AJIB | Arab Jordan Investment Bank | |
| ARBK | Arab Bank | |
| BOJX | Bank of Jordan | |
| CABK | Cairo Amman Bank | |
| EXFB | Capital Bank of Jordan | |
| JIFB | Jordan Investment and Finance Bank | |
| JOGB | Jordan Commercial Bank | |
| JOIB | Jordan Islamic Bank for Finance and Investment | |
| JOKB | Jordan Kuwait Bank | |
| JONB | Jordan National Bank | |
| THBK | The Housing Bank for Trade and Finance | |
| UBSI | Union Bank for Savings and Investment | |

== Insurance sector ==
| Symbol | Company | Notes |
|---|---|---|
| AAIN | Al-Nisr Al-Arabi Insurance | |
| AIUI | Arab Union International Insurance | |
| ARAI | Arab American Takaful Insurance | |
| ARAS | The Arab Assurers | |
| JIJC | Jordan International Insurance | |
| JOIN | Jordan Insurance | |
| MEIN | Middle East Insurance | |

== Service sector ==
| Symbol | Company | Notes |
|---|---|---|
| AAFI | Al-Amin for Investment | |
| ABMS | Al-Bilad Medical Services | |
| AEIV | Arab East Investment | |
| AIHO | Arab International Hotels | |
| AMAL | Al-Amal Investment | |
| AMWL | Portfolio Management and Investment Services | |
| ARED | Arab Real Estate Development | |
| BAMB | Beit El Mal Savings and Investment for Housing | |
| EMAR | Emmar Investments and Real Estate Development | |
| IBFM | International Brokerage and Financial Markets | |
| ICMI | International for Medical Investment | |
| ITSC | Ittihad Schools | |
| JEIH | Jordanian Expatriate Investment Holding | |
| JETT | Jordan Express Tourism Transport | |
| JOEP | Jordanian Electric Power | |
| JOIT | Jordan Investment Trust | |
| JNTH | Al-Tajamouat for Catering and Housing | |
| JTEL | Jordan Telecom | |
| MERM | Al-Tajamouat for Touristic Projects | |
| NAQL | Transport and Investment Barter | |
| NPSC | National Portfolio Securities | |
| PRES | Jordan Press Foundation/Alra'i | |
| REAL | Arab East for Real Estate Investments | |
| REDV | Real Estate Development | |
| REIN | Real Estate Investment | |
| SHIP | Jordan National Shipping Lines | |
| SITT | Salam International Transport and Trading | |
| SPIC | Specialized Investment Compounds | |
| TAMR | Jordan Tammer | |
| UAIC | United Arab Investors | |
| ULDC | Union Land Development Corporation | |
| | Al Dawliya for Hotels & Malls | |
| | Al-Sharq Investments Projects | |
| | Amad and Handi Housing | |
| | Arab International for Investment and Education | |
| | Comprehensive Land Development Land and Investment | |
| | Consulting and Investment Group | |
| | International Arabian Development and Investment Trading | |
| | Investors and Eastern Arab for Industrial and Real Estate Investments | |
| | Jordan Investment and Tourism Transport (Alfa) | |
| | Jordan Loan Guarantee Association | |
| | Jordanian Real Estate for Development | |
| | The Real Estate and Investment Portfolio | |
| | Specialized Trading and Investment | |
| | Zara Investment Holding | |

== Industrial sector ==
| Symbol | Company | Notes |
|---|---|---|
| AALU | Arab Aluminium Industry | |
| ACDT | Arab Chemical Detergents Industries | |
| AIFF | The Arab International Food Factories | |
| APMC | Arab Pharmaceutical Manufacturing | |
| APOT | Arab Potash | |
| CEBC | Al Faris National Company for Investment and Export | |
| DADI | Dar al Dawa Development and Investment | |
| ELZA | El-Zay Ready Wear Manufacturing | |
| FNVO | First National Vegetable Oil | |
| IENG | Rum Metal Industries | |
| ITCC | International Tobacco and Cigarettes | |
| JNCC | Jordan New Cable | |
| JOCF | Jordan Ceramic Industries | |
| JOCM | The Jordan Cement Factories | |
| JOIR | Industrial Resources | |
| JOPH | Jordan Phosphate Mines | |
| JOPI | The Jordan Pipes Manufacturing | |
| JOPT | Jordan Petroleum Refinery | |
| JOST | Jordan Steel | |
| JOWM | The Jordan Worsted Mills | |
| MECE | Middle East Complex for Engineering | |
| NATA | National Aluminium Industrial | |
| NATC | National Chlorine | |
| NAST | National Steel Industry | |
| RMCC | Ready Mix Concrete and Construction Supplies | |
| UMIC | Universal Modern Industries | |
| UTOB | Union Tobacco | |
| WIRE | National Cable and Wire Manufacturing | |
| | Al-Quds Ready Mix | |
| | Century Investment Group | |
| | Comprehensive Multiple Projects | |
| | The Industrial Commercial and Agricultural | |
| | Jordan Pharmacy Manufacturing | |
| | Middle East Pharmaceutical Industries | |
| | Union Chemical and Vegetable Oil Industries | |
