= Samih Darwazah =

Jordanian businessman (1930–2015)

Samih Taleb Mahmoud Darwazah

Minister of Energy and Mineral Resources
- In office 8 Jan 1995 – 4 Feb 1996

Personal details
- Born: 1930 Nablus, British mandate of Palestine
- Died: 15 May 2015 (aged 84–85) London, England

Samih Darwazah (Arabic: سميح دروزة, 1930 – 15 May 2015) was a Jordanian politician, businessman, and founder of Hikma Pharmaceuticals, Jordan's largest pharmaceutical company. He served as Jordan's Minister of Energy and Mineral Resources from 1995 to 1996 and later as a senator in the Jordanian parliament.

== Early life ==
Samih Darwazah was born in Nablus. His father was a tea merchant.

At the age of 10, he became the youngest child to attend the Arab College of Jerusalem.

He studied for a master's degree at the American University of Beirut, Darwazah received a master's degree from the St. Louis College of Pharmacy, Missouri, which he attended on a Fulbright scholarship. In 2010, he was awarded an honorary doctorate from the college.

== Career ==
Darwazah worked for Eli Lilly from 1964 to 1976, before establishing Hikma Pharmaceuticals in 1978. Between 1995 and 1996, he served as Minister of Energy and Mineral Resources to the Government of Jordan. He also founded the Jordan Trade Association and was a member of the Advisory Economic Council to the King of Jordan. In 2007, Darwazah was named the Ernst & Young Middle East Entrepreneur of the Year. He was named chairman of Capital Bank in Jordan in 2009.

He founded Hikma in 1978 in Amman, Jordan. His children joined the business in its early days. The company expanded outside the MENA region, establishing operations in Europe and the US, and was the first Arab company to export pharmaceutical products to the U.S. in 1996. In March 2015, it entered the FTSE 100 index.

== Publications ==
In 2004, Darwazah published his business memoir, Building a Global Success.

== Personal life ==
He was married to Samira Fadli and they had four children, sons Said and Mazen, and daughters May and Hana, all of whom survived him. His son, Said Darwazah, succeeded him as CEO in 2007.

The Darwazah family founded the Samih Darwazah Center for Innovation Management and Entrepreneurship at the Suliman S. Olayan School of Business at American University of Beirut in 2011.
