= Mrajeeb Al Fhood refugee camp =

- Refugee camp
- Location in Jordan
- Coordinates: 32.0335°N 36.4475°E
- Country: Jordan
- Settled: April 2013

Population
  - Total: 4,196
- figures from 2017
- Time zone: UTC+2 (UTC+2)
  - Summer (DST): UTC+3 (UTC+3)

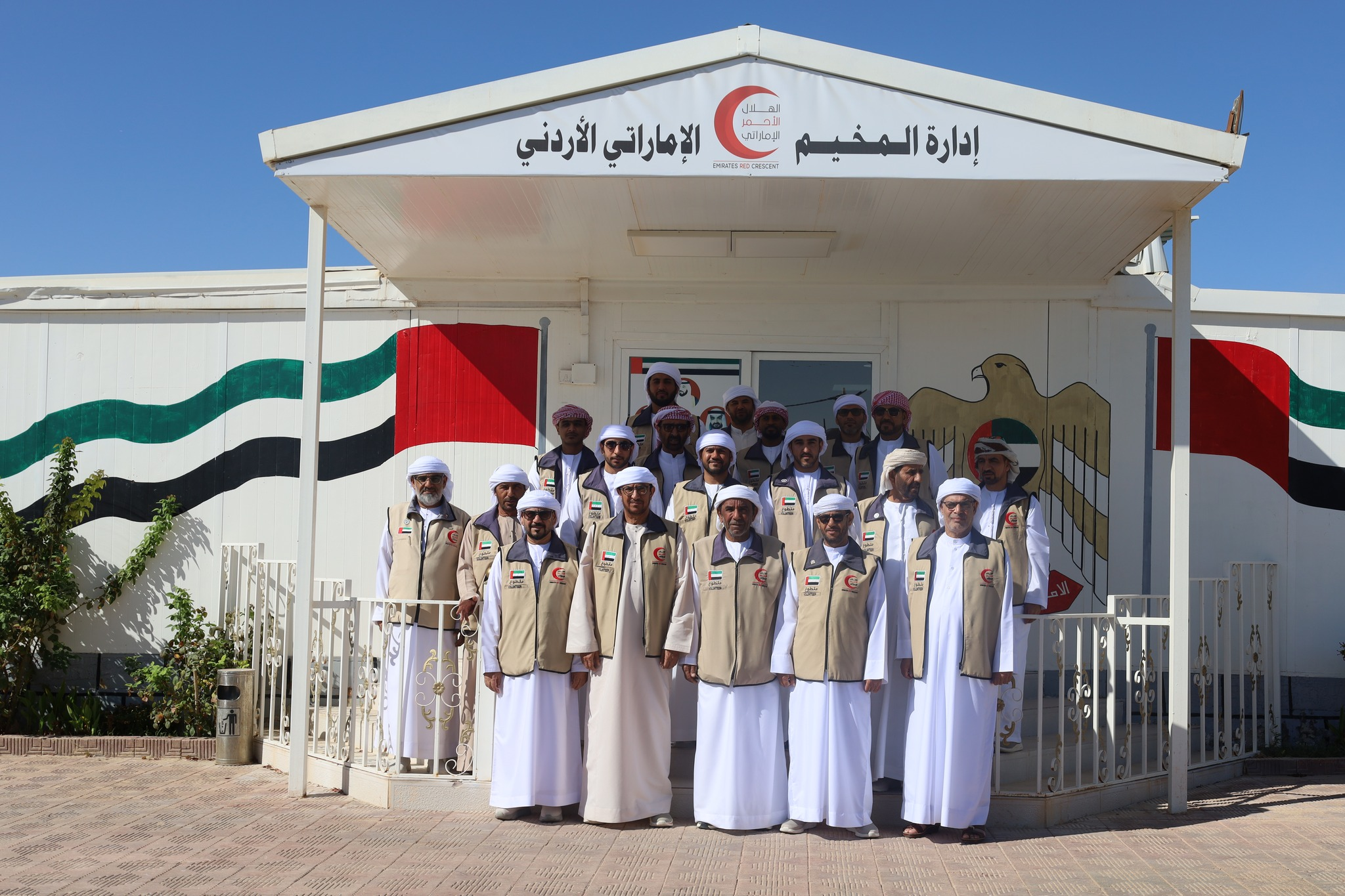

Mrajeeb Al Fhood refugee camp (also spelled variously as Murijep al Fhoud and Marjeeb Al Fahood and also known as Emirati-Jordanian camp; Arabic: المخيم الإماراتي الأردني, romanized: Al-Mukhayyam al-Imārātī al-Urdunī) is a refugee camp for refugees fleeing the Syrian Civil War. It is located in Mrajeeb Al Fhood, a stretch of arid plains some 20 kilometers east of Zarqa, Jordan. It was opened in April 2013 to cope with the overflow from Zaatari refugee camp and is funded by the United Arab Emirates.

At the time of building, Jordanian officials feared that the number of Syrian refugees in Jordan could double in the following six months as the fighting escalated during warmer weather. As of January 2015, the camp had a population of 4,196; in 2017 it housed about the same number.

Mrajeeb Al Fhood is only infrequently visited by journalists due to its isolated location in the Jordanian desert. It is considered a “five star camp”, guaranteeing the best human conditions to refugees. For Syrians fleeing war, upgrading one's own life means being able to relocate to this camp. It gives priority to widows with children, single women, the elderly, disabled people, or large families; single men are not allowed.

In 2017, a delegation of members from the European Parliament (MEPs) of the “EU-UAE Parliamentary Friendship Group” visited the camp, the first such visit by a European parliamentary delegation since the opening of the camp. In 2018, the Dubai International Humanitarian Aid and Development Conference and Exhibition (DIHAD) in cooperation with the Emirates Red Crescent (ERC), with the support of the UAE Embassy in Jordan, launched a humanitarian initiative to support the Syrian refugees by providing and distributing a total of 2,400 school bags, stationery and other essential educational supplies for the students of the camp.

== See also ==
- List of Syrian refugee camps in Jordan
- Zaatari refugee camp
- Syrians in Jordan
