= Petrokimia Gresik =

Indonesian fertilizer company

Coordinates: 7.156935°S 112.640031°E

PT Petrokimia Gresik

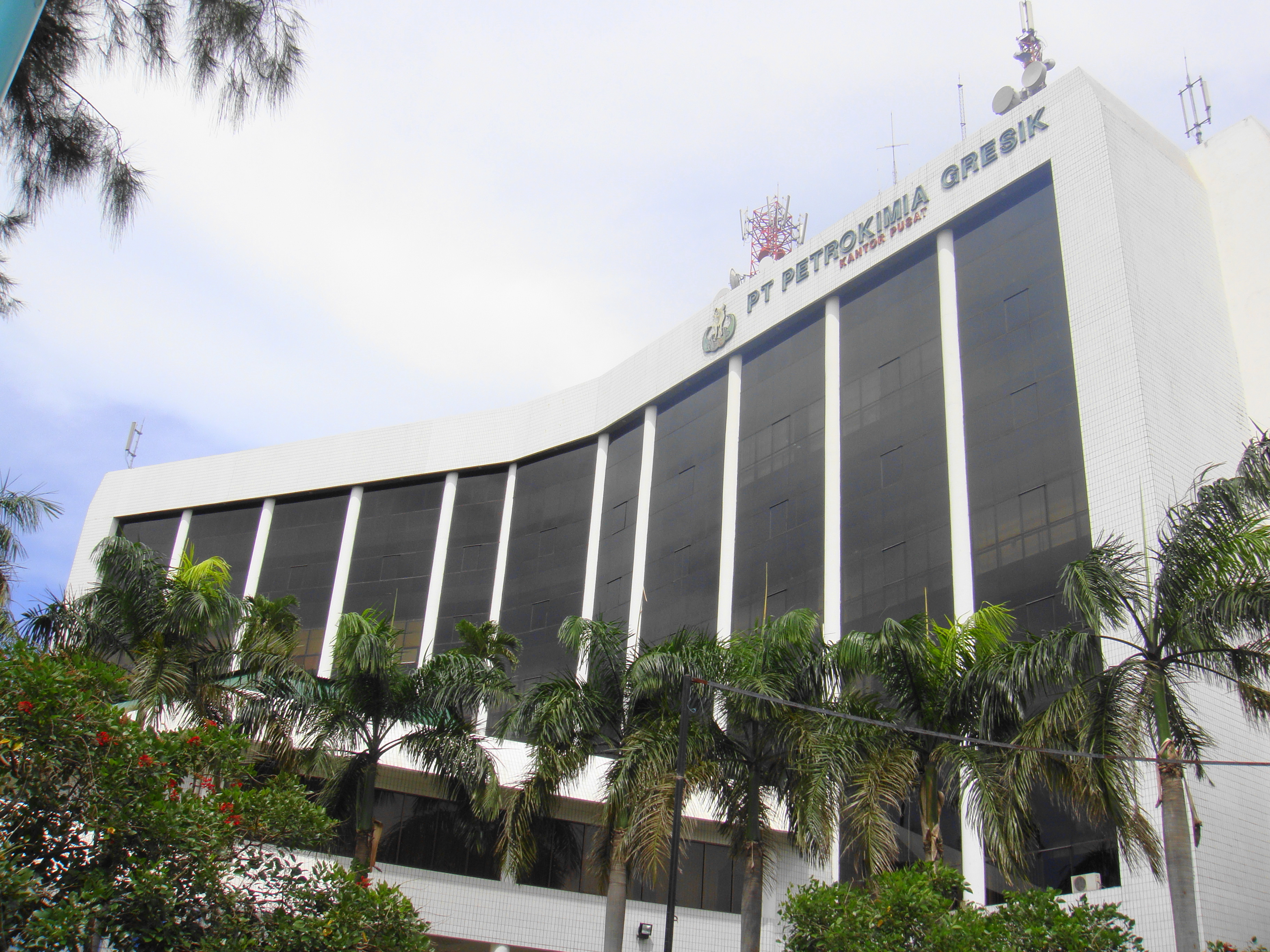
- Petrokimia Gresik headquarters di Gresik
- Company type: Subsidiary
- Industry: Fertilizer and Chemicals
- Founded: 10 July 1972; 53 years ago
- Headquarters: Gresik, Indonesia
- Area served: Southeast Asia
- Products: Fertilizer; Probiotic
- Revenue: Rp28,903 trillion (2021)
- Net income: Rp1,941 trillion (2021)
- Total assets: Rp43,183 trillion (2021)
- Total equity: Rp19,499 trillion (2021)
- Owner: Government of Indonesia
- Number of employees: 2,043 (2021)
- Parent: Pupuk Indonesia
- Subsidiaries: Petrokimia Kayaku; Petrosida Gresik; Petro Jordan Abadi (50%)
- Website: www.petrokimia-gresik.com

Petrokimia Gresik is a fertilizer company located in Gresik, East Java, Indonesia, which was initially established under the name 'Project of Petrokimia Surabaya'.

The construction agreement was mutually signed on August 10, 1964 with the effective date on December 8, 1964. The project was officially inaugurated by the President of the Republic of Indonesia on July 10, 1972. Hence the date is ultimately commemorated as the anniversary of PT Petrokimia Gresik.

== Early history ==
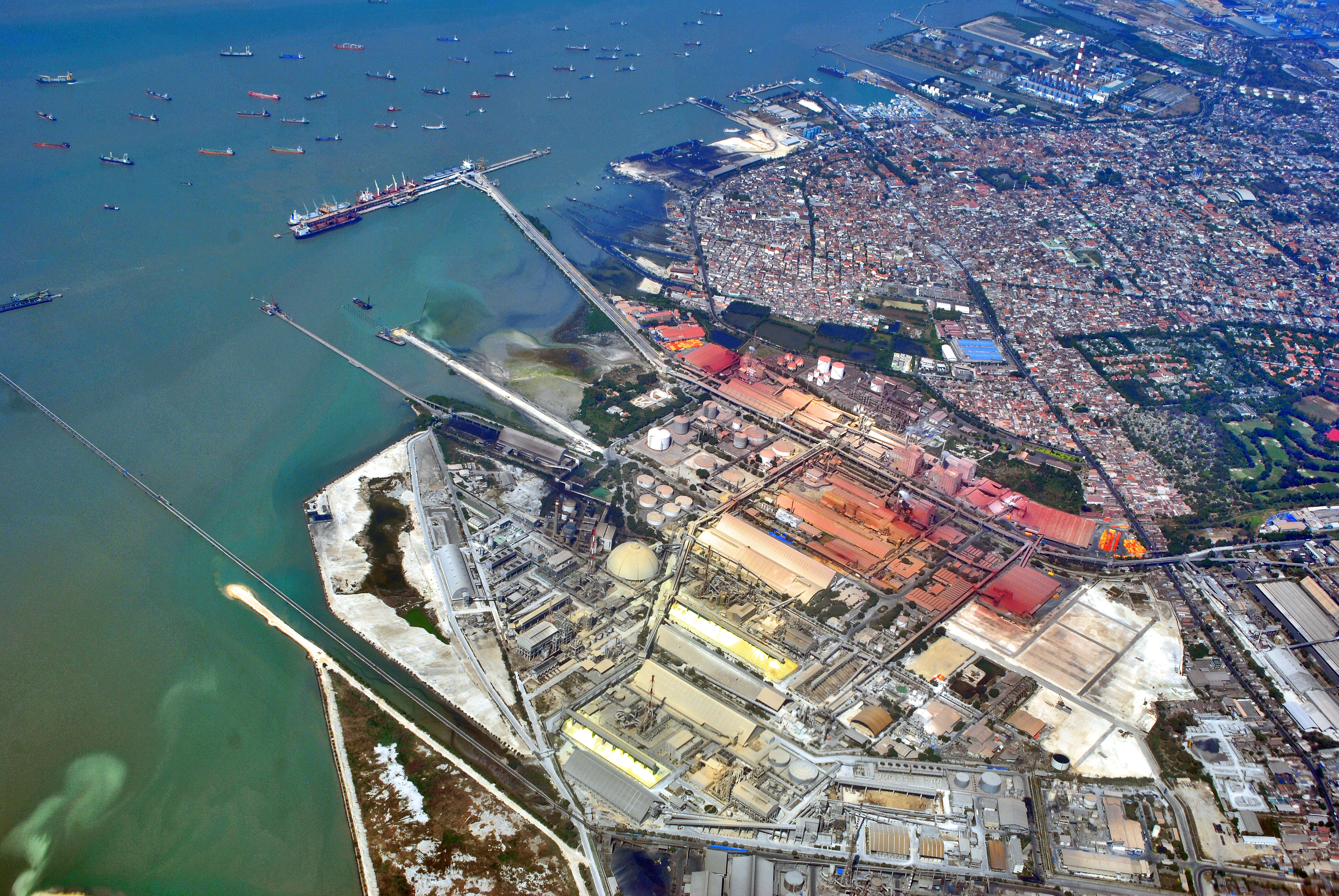
PT Petrokimia Gresik, aerial view of plant 2015

After the establishment of PT Pupuk Sriwidjaja located in Palembang in 1959, the government also facilitated the construction of other fertilizer factories. The forerunner of PT Petrokimia Gresik since 1956 through the State Design Bureau (Biro Perancang Negara - BPN). At first, the fertilizer plant built in East Java was called 'Surabaja Petrochemical Project'. The name of Petrokimia itself comes from 'Petroleum Chemical' which is abbreviated to Petrochemical, namely chemicals made from petroleum and natural gas.

The Surabaja Petrochemical Project is determined based on MPR Decree No. II of 1960 which was listed as a Priority Project in the Pattern of National Development Planning for Phase I (1961-1969) and confirmed by Decree of the President of the Republic of Indonesia No. 260 of 1960.1 / Instr / 1963 and declared as a Vital Project in accordance with Presidential Decree no. 225 of 1963.

Gresik was chosen as the location of fertilizer factories as a result of a feasibility study in 1962 by the Industrial Project Preparation Agency (BP3I) coordinated by the Ministry of Industry and Mining. At that time, Gresik agreed with the considerations, including:

- Availability of 450 hectares of vacant land.
- It is quite close to the availability of water sources from the main rivers of Java; Brantas River and the Bengawan Solo River.
- Adjacent to the largest fertilizer consumer area, namely plantations and sugar cane farmers because Java is the largest agriculture producer.
- Close to the coastal area, making it easier to transport factory equipment during the construction, procurement of raw materials, and distribution of production by maritime transport.
- Part of Surabaya Metropolitan Area (Gerbangkertosusila), economic hub of Indonesia.

== Products ==
PT Petrokimia Gresik has two product categories, namely fertilizer and non-fertilizer. For subsidized fertilizer, PT Petrokimia Gresik produces Urea, NPK (Phonska), Petroganik (organic fertilizer), SP-36, and ZA fertilizers. As for non-subsidies, PT Petrokimia Gresik produces NPK Kebomas, ZK, DAP, KCL, Rock Phosphate, Petronik, Petro Kalimas, Petro Biofertil, and Agricultural Lime. For the non-fertilizer category, PT Petrokimia Gresik produces superior rice seeds under the name Petroseed and Petro Hybrid, as well as decomposers named Petro Gladiator. Not only that, PT Petrokimia Gresik also has a probiotic product called Petrofish to increase the productivity of fish ponds, shrimp. Petro Chick for poultry (chicken and duck), and Fit Rice, which is rice with a low glycemic index.

PT Petrokimia Gresik also produces chemical products for various industries. Among them are ammonia, sulfuric acid, phosphoric acid, cement retarder, aluminium fluoride, liquid O_{2}, dry ice, chloride acid, oxygen, nitrogen, hydrogen, and gypsum.
