= Jordan Phosphate Mines =

- Type: Public company
- Industry: Mining, manufacturing
- Founded: 1953
- Headquarters: Amman, Jordan
- Key people: Amin Kamel Kawar (founder); Mohammad Thneibat (chair)
- Products: Phosphates, fertilizer, chemicals
- Net income: JD603 million (2025)
- Website: www.jpmc.com.jo

Jordan Phosphate Mines (JPMC) is a mining company based in Amman, Jordan. The company operates 3 mining facilities in Jordan and a chemical manufacturing complex in Aqaba. The company is listed on the Amman Stock Exchange's ASE Weighted Index as "JOPH".

== Background ==
Jordan Phosphate Mines was founded in 1949.

In 1986, JPMC bought the Jordan Fertilizer Company. JPMC already controlled 25% of the fertilizing company before its full acquisition. Jordan Fertilizer was operating a chemical and fertilizer manufacturing complex in Aqaba, which became the property of JPMC.

In 2007, JPMC signed a memorandum of understanding with the Indian Farmers Fertiliser Cooperative (IFFCO), India's largest fertilizer manufacturer. In 2013, the partnership was renewed for one year, committing JPMC to deliver 2 million tonnes of phosphate in a year.

In the first semester of 2014, JPMC recorded a net loss of $9.4 million, mainly due to lower commodity prices and higher fuel costs.

In April 2016, JPMC raised JD82.5 million. In February 2017, JPMC signed a memorandum of understanding with the government of Bangladesh to provide the country with 270,000 metric tonnes of phosphate and phosphoric acid within 3 years for $280 million. In May 2018, IFFCO and Indian Potash Limited (IPL) bought a 37% share in JPMC from the Brunei Investment Agency for $130 million. 60% of JPMC's production was already exported to India by the time of this purchase.

In April 2026 the general assembly approved raising the company's capital to JD500 million by capitalising JD200 million of retained earnings, distributed to shareholders as bonus shares. For 2025 the company reported a net profit after tax of about JD603 million and total assets of JD2.367 billion.

== Operations ==
=== Mining ===
According to the company's website, more than 60% of the area of Jordan has phosphate deposits at minable depth. JPMC is the only phosphate-mining company in Jordan. JPMC's three mining facilities are located in:

- Russeifa, 15 kilometers (9 mi) north of Amman, started in 1935;
- Al Hassa and Al-Abiad, 135 kilometers (84 mi) south of Amman, started in 1962 and 1979;
- Eshidiya, 125 kilometers (78 mi) northeast of Aqaba, started in 1989.

=== Manufacturing ===
JPMC's al-Aqaba complex produces fertilizer and chemicals, including:

- Phosphoric acid - used to make fertilizers, detergents, pharmaceuticals, steel and cola;
- Diammonium phosphate - DAP fertilizer;
- Sulphuric acid - many uses;
- Aluminium fluoride - used as a catalyst in the manufacture of aluminium and magnesium; used as a ceramic glaze.

== Partnerships and joint-ventures ==
JPMC runs the Indo-Jordan Chemicals, co-owned with Southern Petrochemical Industries of India and The Arab Investment Company of Saudi Arabia.

JPMC runs the Nippon Jordan Fertilizer Company, a joint venture with the Arab Potash Company and a consortium of Japanese companies (ZEN-NOH, Mitsubishi Corporation, Mitsubishi Chemical, Asahi Kasei).

JPMC runs the PT Petro Jordan Abadi, a joint venture with the Indonesian company Petrokimia Gresik.

== Incidents ==
In June 2013, the uncle of the King of Jordan, Walid Kurdi, was found guilty of illegally profiting by using his position of CEO of JPMC. The justice fined him JD284 million. In August 2017, JPMC filed for an arrest warrant with Interpol to extradite Walid Kurdi who fled the country and was living as a fugitive.
