= Syrians in Jordan =

Total population
- 1,400,000 estimated (ِAugust 2015); 662,010 registered (July 2019); 404,047 registered (February 2026); 380,990 registered (June 2026)

Regions with significant populations
- Amman, Zaatari and Mrajeeb Al Fhood refugee camps

Languages
- Arabic (Syrian Arabic), Turkish, Kurdish

Religion
- Islam (mainly Sunni Islam), Christianity and Druze

Syrians in Jordan include migrants from Syria to Jordan, as well as their descendants. The number of Syrian refugees in Jordan is estimated at around 662,010 people registered as of July 2019,. The number of Syrians (including non-refugees) stands at 1.266 million, according to the 2015 Population and Housing Census .

Syrian refugees in Jordan are formed of various ethnic and religious groups. The majority are Arabs (including Palestinians), Syrian Turkmen and Syrian Kurds.

== Notable people ==
- Queen Noor – Queen of Jordan from 1978, until 1999, she is the mother of Prince Hamza, Prince Hashim, Princess Iman, and Princess Raiyah
- Princess Alia Tabbaa – first wife of Prince Faisal bin Hussein
- Omar Razzaz – 42nd Prime Minister of Jordan; he is the son of Munif Razzaz.
- Hani Mulki – 41st Prime Minister of Jordan
- Nader Dahabi – 37th Prime Minister of Jordan
- Fawzi Mulki – 10th Prime Minister of Jordan
- Hasan Abu Al-Huda – 4th Prime Minister of Jordan
- Ali al-Rikabi – 3rd Prime Minister of Jordan
- Mazhar Raslan – 2nd Prime Minister of Jordan
- Mohammad Ali Bdeir – industrialist and businessman, founder of Jordan Electric Power Company, which introduced electric power to Amman
- Talal Abu-Ghazaleh, businessman, born to a Palestinian father and Syrian mother

== See also ==
- Jordan–Syria relations
- List of Syrian refugee camps in Jordan
- Palestinians in Jordan
- Refugees of the Syrian Civil War
- Refugees of the Syrian Civil War in Jordan
- Syrian diaspora
- Syrians in Lebanon
- Syrian refugee camps
