= Logistaas =

- Industry: Transport
- Founded: 2015; 11 years ago in Amman, Jordan
- Headquarters: Amman, Jordan
- Website: logistaas.com

Logistaas is a cloud‑based transportation management system (TMS) provider, founded in 2015 and headquartered in Amman, Jordan. The company develops software solutions for freight forwarders, non‑vessel operating common carriers (NVOCCs), and logistics providers. It has been recognised among the Middle East's fastest‑growing technology firms by Deloitte and has operations in over 80 countries.

== History ==
Logistaas was founded in 2015 and is based in Amman, Jordan. The company started by building a cloud-based platform to help freight forwarders manage shipments, pricing, and documentation in one system. It was developed to meet the needs of logistics companies looking for easier ways to handle everyday tasks without relying on spreadsheets or disconnected tools.

Over the years, Logistaas introduced integrations with various third-party freight technology platforms. In 2024, it integrated with WebCargo by Freightos, enabling access to air cargo pricing and eBooking functionality across multiple carriers. A connection with Cargofive enabled users to access and compare ocean freight rates from over 25 carriers directly in the system. Another integration with WebCargo by Freightos provided access to multi-carrier rates and supported digital booking through API connectivity.

Logistaas has been recognised by Deloitte's Technology Fast program in consecutive years. In 2024, the company ranked 12th in the Deloitte Middle East Technology Fast 50 and was also included in the Deloitte Technology Fast 500 globally. In 2025, Logistaas ranked 16th in the Deloitte Middle East Technology Fast 50, based on revenue growth among technology companies in the region.

Logistaas also operates an office in Manchester, United Kingdom, which supports its European customer base.

=== Products and services ===
Logistaas provides a modular, subscription-based TMS platform built for logistics companies managing air, sea, and land shipments. The platform includes tools for quotation and pricing, shipment operations, financial documentation, and customer-facing portals. The system supports multimodal shipping, import/export workflows, cross-trade, and consolidated shipments. The company has integrated its platform with industry-standard systems including INTTRA for ocean bookings and Traxon CargoHUB for air freight connectivity.

In 2025, Logistaas announced new integrations with third-party freight rate platforms. A partnership with Cargofive enabled users to access and compare ocean freight rates from over 25 carriers within the Logistaas system. Additionally, integration with WebCargo by Freightos introduced API-based rate visibility and booking functionality across multiple carrier networks.

The software supports localization features such as multi-language options, regional tax compliance, and electronic invoicing integrations. It also connects with accounting systems like SAP, QuickBooks, and Sage.

=== Market presence and recognition ===
Logistaas reports a user base spanning over 80 countries. Although its operations are centered in the Middle East, the platform is used by logistics companies in Asia, Africa, and Europe, with its Manchester office supporting customers in the United Kingdom and Europe.

In 2025, the company was recognized in the Deloitte Middle East Technology Fast 50, ranking 16th out of hundreds of applicants.

In addition to its Deloitte recognitions, Logistaas achieved SOC 2 certification in 2025, confirming its adherence to recognised data security and operational control standards following an independent audit.

== See also ==
- Transportation management system
- Freight forwarding
