= Arab Potash =

Mining company in Jordan

Arab Potash Company

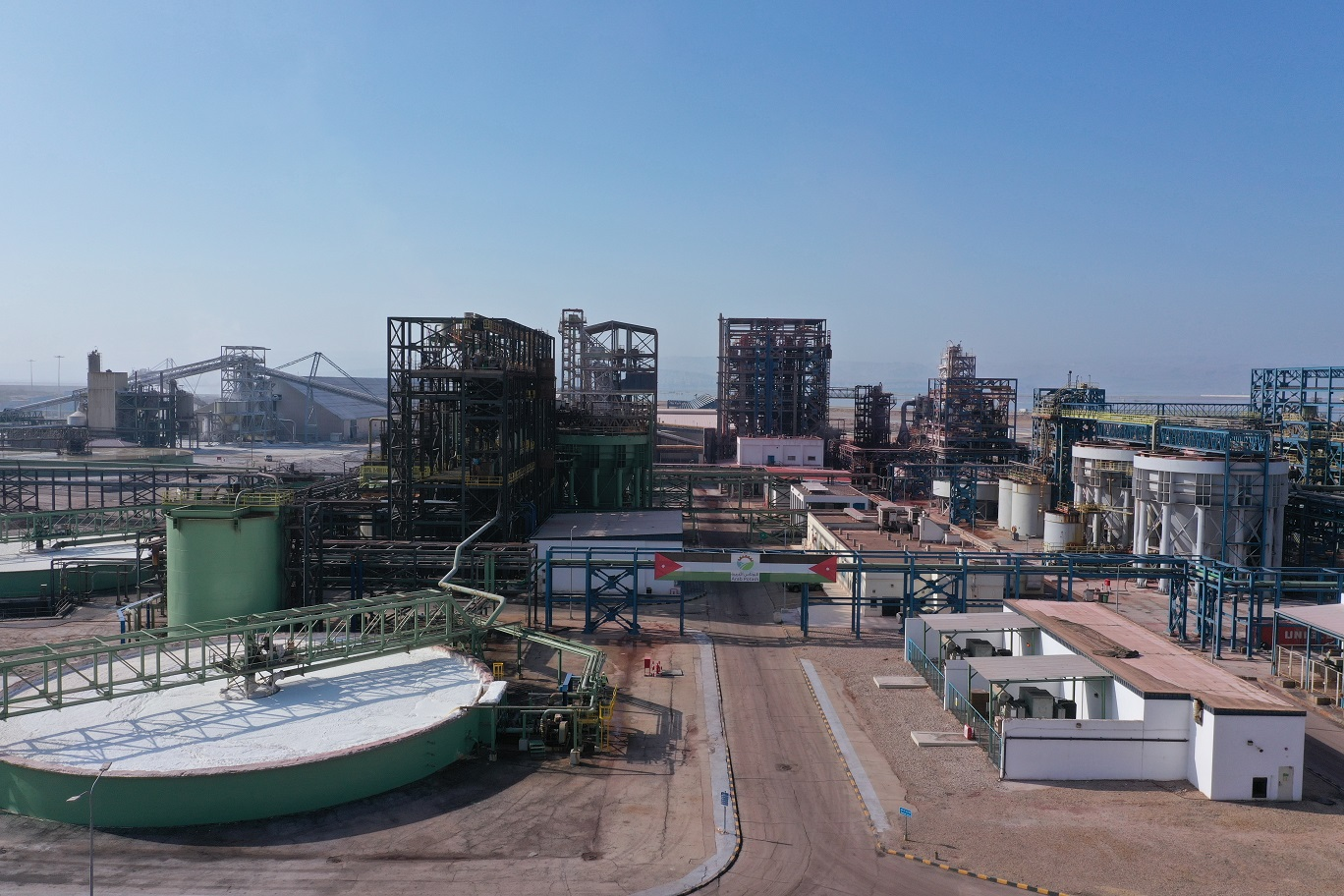
- Industry: Mining
- Founded: 1956
- Headquarters: Amman, Jordan,
- Key people: Shehadah Abu Hdaib (Chairman), Maen Nsour (President and CEO)
- Products: Potash (mainly potassium chloride), Saltpeter (potassium nitrate) and other derivatives
- Website: www.arabpotash.com

The Arab Potash Company (APC) is a Jordanian company that is primarily involved in harvesting minerals from the Dead Sea. It is the eighth largest potash producer worldwide by volume of production and the sole Arab producer of potash. The company was formed in 1956 in the Hashemite Kingdom of Jordan as a pan-Arab business venture and it has a 100-year concession (1958-2058) from the government of Jordan that grants it exclusive rights to extract, manufacture and market minerals from the Dead Sea. It is headquartered in Amman and has its main plants at Ghor Al Safi, near the southern end of the Dead Sea. The company's stock is listed on the Amman Stock Exchange's ASE Weighted Index.

== History ==
Although the Dead Sea had long been known to have large amounts of mineral deposits – including potash, the earliest efforts to produce potash dates back only to the 1920s, when Moshe Novomeysky built a potash and bromine production site in Kalil. By the end of the 1930s, his company added another facility. However, the Kalil facility was destroyed during the 1948 Arab–Israeli War, while the other facility halted its production, which put an end to the project.

In 1956, the government of Jordan collaborated with some Arab countries, including Saudi Arabia, Kuwait, Iraq, and Libya to establish the Arab Potash Company, in order to extract and produce potash and other minerals from the Dead Sea, of which the government of Jordan kept the majority of the stake. One year later, the government of Jordan granted the company the exclusive rights for all mining operations at the Dead Sea for 100 years. However, the APC took over two decades to begin to launch its first production facility. In 1983, the company shipped its first commercial shipments of potash.

In 1992, the APC became a minority partner in Nippon Jordan Ferilizers Company. In 1999, the Kamira Arab Potash Company (KEPACO) was formed as a joint venture between Arab Potash and Finnish company Kemira Agro. KEPACO was inaugurated by King Abdullah II in 2003. By the end of the year, the company began supplying Potassium nitrate to the local market.

In 2000, the government of Jordan signed deals to export its potash production to France and Egypt. In 2001, the government announced it will sell its 52.9% stake in the APC. It received offers from German company Kali und Salz, Japanese company Mitsubishi, and Canadian company PotashCorp. By the end of 2003, PotashCorp purchased 28% of the government's stake in the company. In 2007, the APC's net profit reached a record JD150 million.

In February 2014, Arab Potash signed a 15-year deal with US-based Noble Energy to provide Arab Potash, through its Israeli affiliates, with two billion cubic metres of natural gas. In 2018, China's SDIC Mining Investment Co. purchased the 28% stake owned by Canadian company Nutrien in Arab Potash for $502 million. In 2019, Arab Potash produced Red Potash for the first time and exported its first shipment to Brazil. The company achieved JD125 million in net profits in 2018. In 2019, its net profit increased to JD152 million, while in 2020, it generated JD127 million. Jamal Al Sarayrah – who served as the chairman of the board of directors since June 2012, resigned on December 18, 2020. He was succeeded by Shehadah Abu Hdaib.

== Operations ==
The Arab Potash Company is located 110 km (68 mi) south of Amman and 200 km (120 mi) north of Aqaba. The site is basically a solar evaporation pond system of an area of 112 m^{2} (1,210 sq ft) and processing plants. APC produces four grades of potash: standard, fine, granular and industrial grade potash through the following process:

- Solar ponds: the process starts at the brine intake pumping station located on the Lisan peninsula where four intake pumps with a capacity of approximately 20 m^{3}/s (710 cu ft/s) deliver 250 - 300 million tons per year of Dead Sea water. The precipitated raw carnallite is the raw material for producing potash is precipitated as mixture of carnallite (KCl.MgCl_{2}.6H_{2}O) and NaCl. This bed is harvested as a slurry from beneath the brine and delivered to booster pumps on the dikes and then to the refinery through floating pipes.
- Processing plants: The Hot Leach Plant: APC utilizes the hot leach process technology to produce high grade standard and fine potash, which includes the following units of operation: Carnallite Processing; Sylvinite Processing; Crystallization; Product Dewatering; Drying; Screening
- Industrial potash plant: industrial grade potash (KCl) is the premium form of potassium chloride (99.2% KCl min.) that is produced to meet the needs of the non-fertilizer sector.
- Cold crystallization plant I: the cold crystallization plant is independent of the hot leach facility. It is operated under ambient temperature and therefore requires less energy. It includes the following processes: carnallite receiving; flotation; crystallization; cold leaching; drying
- Cold crystallization plant II: a second cold crystallization plant (II) came into operation in September 2010 to give a total production of 450,000 tons annually. The new plant is much similar to the cold crystallization plant I, but it encompasses certain areas of modified processes and advanced technology. A new compaction plant was also installed to produce more than 250,000 tons annually of high quality granular potash. The new compaction plant comprises a post-treatment unit to enhance the quality of granular potash.

== Markets ==
APC's principal export markets are India, China and Malaysia.

== Subsidiaries and affiliates ==
Arab Potash has several Dead Sea-area affiliates and subsidiary projects, including:

- Arab Fertilizers & Chemicals Industries (KEMAPCO) Established in 1998, KEMAPCO is a limited liability company wholly owned by APC. KEMAPCO produces potassium nitrate fertilizer (of which it supplies around 12% of world's total demand), dicalcium phosphate, animal feed and nitric acid, for markets in Europe and Asia.
- Numeira Mixed Salts and Mud Company is a limited liability company founded in 1997 and wholly owned by APC. Numeira produces "mixed salts" and "Dead Sea Mud" for the cosmetics industry. The company is the domestic cosmetic industry's sole supplier of Dead Sea raw materials.
- Jordan Bromine Company (JBC), established in 1999, is a joint venture with Albemarle Holdings Company of the United States, dedicated to producing bromine and bromine derivatives, including tetra bromo bis phenol-A (TBBP-A), used as a flame retardant; calcium bromide, which is used in the oil drilling industry; sodium bromide, used in photography; and hydrogen bromide. JBC completed extensive expansion of its plant in the second quarter of 2013 at an investment of JD 120 million, which raised its production capacity to more than 200,000 tons annually.
- Nippon Jordan Fertilizers Company - was established in 1992 as a joint venture between APC, Jordan Phosphate Mines Company (JPMC), ZEN-NOH, Mitsubishi Corporation, Mitsubishi Chemical (formerly Mitsubishi Kasei) and Asahi Industries. It produces NPK fertilizer and DAP Fertilizer (diammonium phosphate) exported primarily to the Japanese market.
- Jordan Industrial Ports Company (JIPC) was established in 2009 as a joint venture between APC and the Jordan Phosphate Mines Company (JPMC), following a memorandum of understanding signed in 2008 by APC and JPMC with the Aqaba Development Corporation (ADC) and the Aqaba Special Economic Zone Authority (ASEZA) to refurbish, develop, upgrade, and expand the existing jetty. Implementation work started immediately after signing the operating and management agreement with ADC in 2013, and it was scheduled to be completed in 2016.
