= Hikma Pharmaceuticals =

British multinational pharmaceutical company

Hikma Pharmaceuticals plc
- Type: Public
- Traded as: LSE: HIK; FTSE 250 Component
- Industry: Pharmaceutical
- Founded: 1978; 48 years ago Jordan
- Founder: Samih Darwazah
- Headquarters: London, England, UK
- Key people: Said Darwazah (Chairperson); Said Darwazah (CEO)
- Products: Amoclan; Prograf; Suprax
- Revenue: ▲US$3,349 million (2025)
- Operating income: ▲US$741 million (2025)
- Net income: ▲US$407 million (2025)
- Number of employees: 9,500 (2026)
- Website: www.hikma.com

Hikma Pharmaceuticals plc is a British multinational pharmaceutical company with headquarters in London, UK that manufactures non-branded generic and in-licensed pharmaceutical products. It was founded by Samih Darwazah in Amman, Jordan in 1978. It is listed on the London Stock Exchange and is a constituent of the FTSE 250 Index.

== History ==
The company was founded in 1978 by Samih Darwazah in Amman, Jordan. In August 1996 it became the first Arab company to export pharmaceutical products to the United States. It was first listed on the London Stock Exchange in 2005. Acquisitions in the mid-2000s include Instituto Biochimico Pavese Pharma in Italy in 2005 and Jazeera Pharmaceutical Industries in Saudi Arabia in 2006. In 2007 the company went on to buy APM in Jordan, Alkan Pharma in Egypt, APM and Al Jazeera Pharma in Saudi Arabia, Thymoorgan in Germany, and Ribosepharm in Germany. It started to acquire Baxter Healthcare Corporation's US generic injectables business, Multi-Source Injectables or MSI, and completed the transaction in May 2011.

In October 2011, Hikma Pharmaceuticals entered the Moroccan market through the acquisition of Promopharm, the ninth largest pharmaceutical manufacturer in Morocco. Hikma also inaugurated the Al Dar Al Arabia Pharmaceutical Manufacturing Company in Algeria in 2011. The Algerian pharmaceutical company is Hikma's second venture in Algeria after Hikma Pharma Algeria.

In 2011 the company won the ICSA / Hermes Transparency in Governance Award for the best audit disclosure for a FTSE 250 company.

Hikma expanded its existing presence in the Egyptian market through the acquisition of the Egyptian Company for Pharmaceuticals and Chemical Industries (EPCI) in 2012. In September 2013, Hikma announced expansion into Sub-Saharan Africa with a 50:50 joint venture agreement with MIDROC Pharmaceuticals Limited, to enter the Ethiopian pharmaceutical market.

On 28 May 2014, Hikma Pharmaceuticals agreed to acquire assets from the U.S. generic injectable drugs business of Germany's Boehringer Ingelheim for up to $300 million, boosting its presence in the injected medicine market.

In June 2020, Boehringer announced it would sell off part of its stake in London-listed Hikma Pharmaceuticals (28 million out of a 40 million share holding) for around $800 million.

== Operations ==
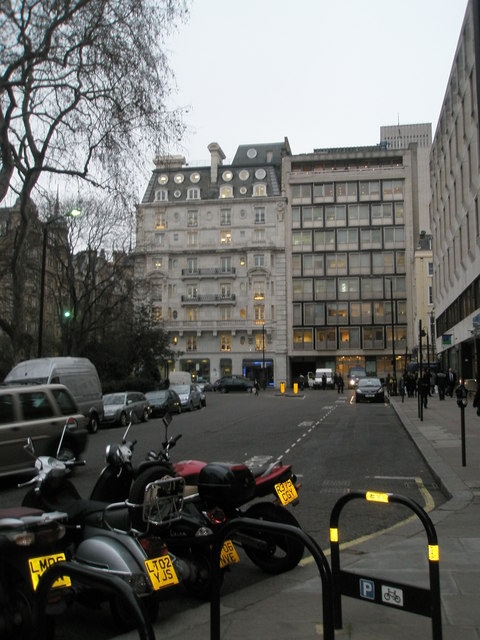
Hikma Pharmaceuticals' head office in Hanover Square in London (on the left)

Hikma Pharmaceutical's operations span 29 manufacturing plants in 10 countries: United States, Portugal, Italy, Jordan, Saudi Arabia, Algeria, Germany, Egypt, Morocco, and Tunisia.

== Business segments ==
=== Branded ===
Hikma's branded business segment comprises the development and sales of branded generics and in-licensed patented products in the MENA region. Hikma has 499 products in 1,256 dosage strengths. Top products include Actos, Amoclan, Blopress, Omnicef, Prograf, and Suprax.

=== Injectables ===
Hikma sells specialized injectable products in the US, Europe and MENA including argatroban, fentanyl, phenylephrine, robaxin, and iron gluconate. The company sells 200 products in 379 dosage forms and strengths.

=== Generics ===
Hikma's oral generic products are sold in the US and include such products as amoxicillin, cephalexin, doxycycline, methocarbamol, and prednisone.

== See also ==
- Pharmaceutical industry in the United Kingdom
