= Said Darwazah =

Jordanian heir and business executive

- Born: Said Samih Taleb Darwazah; May 1957 (age 69)
- Education: Purdue University; INSEAD
- Occupations: Chairman and CEO, Hikma Pharmaceuticals
- Parent: Samih Darwazah

Said Samih Taleb Darwazah (born 1957) is a Jordanian heir and businessman. He is the chairman and chief executive officer (CEO) of Hikma Pharmaceuticals, British pharmaceutical manufacturer founded by his father that is a constituent of the FTSE 250 Index.

== Career ==
Darwazah was born in May 1957, the son of Samih Darwazah, the founder of Hikma Pharmaceuticals, which he joined in 1980. He has a bachelor's degree in Industrial Engineering from Purdue University in the US, and an MBA from INSEAD. Darwazah was appointed CEO in July 2007, and chairman in May 2014.
