= Jordan Petroleum Refinery Company =

Oil refinery in Jordan

Coordinates: 32.1230721°N 36.1116669°E

Jordan Petroleum Refinery Company شركة مصفاة البترول الاردنية
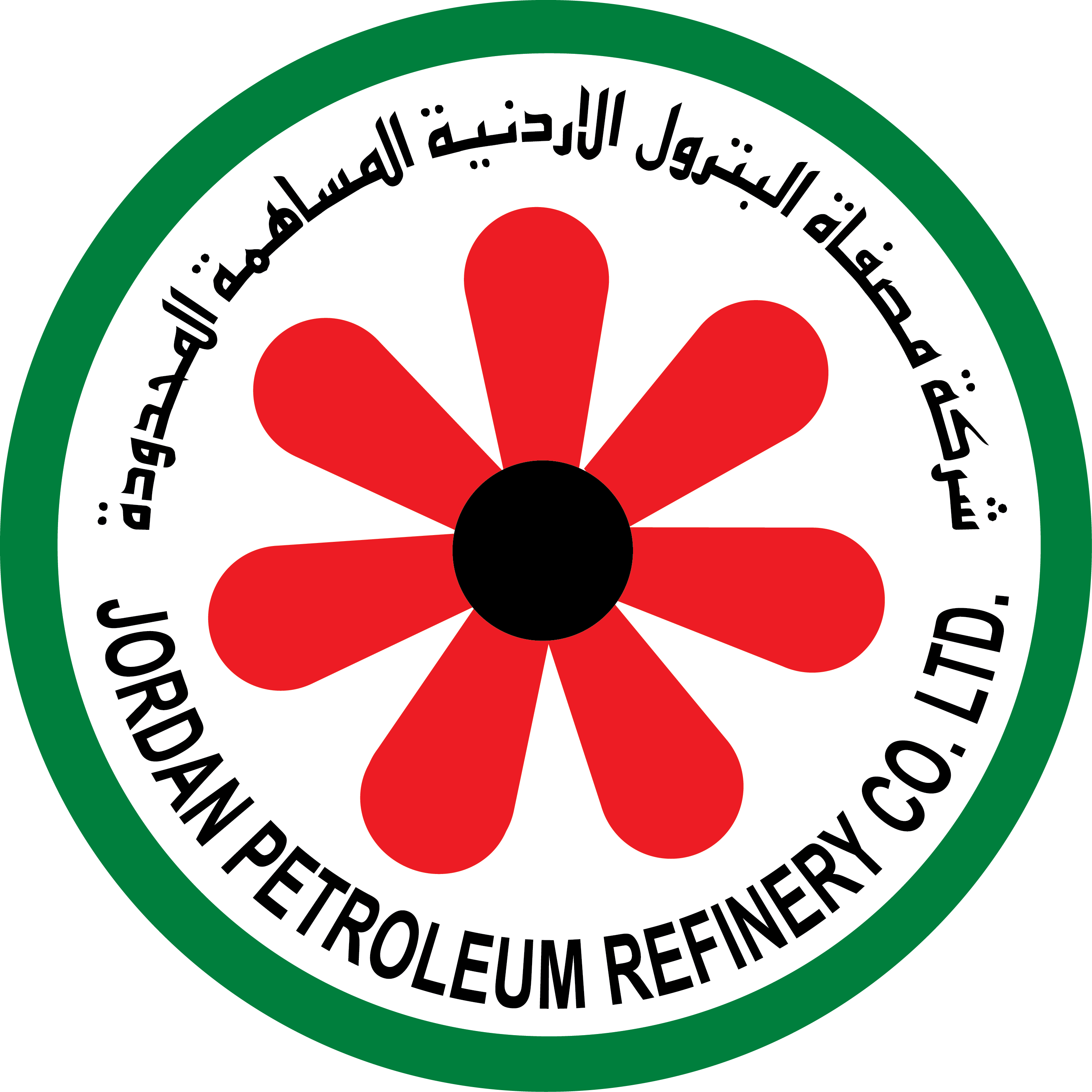
- Industry: Oil and gas
- Founded: 1956
- Headquarters: Amman, Jordan
- Key people: Eng. Abed Al Rahim Boucai (Chairman); Eng. Abdel Karim Alawin (CEO)
- Products: Petroleum products
- Owner: Government of Jordan
- Parent: Jordan Refinery Group
- Website: http://www.jopetrol.com.jo/

Jordan Petroleum Refinery Company (Arabic: شركة مصفاة البترول الأردنية) runs the only oil refinery in Jordan and was established in 1956. The idea of establishing Jordan Petroleum Refinery Company dates back to more than half a century when the idea was adopted by the then Ministry of National Economy, and there was a consensus on the importance of refining industry as a main source of energy for most of the economic activities and as a contributor to raising the Kingdom's revenues. Although it is the only Refinery in Jordan, it managed to supply the local market with all its needs of various petroleum products, and its establishment had led to complete dependence on the imported high-cost oil derivatives; this had saved the Jordanian economy significant amounts of foreign currency, made available thousands job opportunities to citizens, opened the door to other new industries, and contributed to supporting important economy sectors such as the sector of electricity, transportation, industry and constructions.

In 2021, JPRC recorded the highest net profit in company history, JD52.2 million. The profits are the combination of JD20.6 million from activities at the refinery and from filling gas cylinders, than JD7 million from the lubricant factory, and the remaining JD24.3 million from the Jordan Petroleum Marketing Company (JoPetrol).

In June 2022, JPRC finalized the financial settlement for the dues owed to them from the National Electric Power Company, with the Ministry of Finance, in which the government will repay JD105 million during 2023 first quarter. Further negotiations are still on going with the government for the 2019 and 2020 gas activity commissions, in which annual return of 12 percent on investments is to be taken into consideration.

In October 2022, JPRC was working together with project management contractors and financial, technical and legal advisors on the implementation of the fourth expansion project at the refinery. Various international companies came together to make three different offers which the JPRC needed to choose from. JPRC began discussions with one of the consortia consisting of three companies from China, Italy and Japan; the bidding time for the project ended in December 2022. The expansion is expected to cost more than $2.6 billion.

In January 2023 came the announcement about a $3 billion contract with Sinopec Engineering Co, Technimont and Itochu Corp. for the joint development of the fourth phase expansion at the Zarqa refinery. The expansion is expected to increase daily capacities from 60,000 barrels to 150,000.

In 2023, JPRC signed an agreement for the termination of its concessions with the government, in which they made a payment of JD20.4 million for stake in their assets and those of the airports and city of Aqaba.

The JRPC signed a new contract with UOP (U.S.) and Technip for the Refinery Modernization Project planned to increase capacity to 73,000 barrels per day. Construction began in 2024 at the Zarqa refinery for the 10,000 ton LPG storage facility intended to be completed in 2026.

For the year 2025, the JPRC reported a net income of JD74.79 million, an increase to the JD72.42 from 2024.

== See also ==
- List of companies of Jordan
