= Chlorine acid =

Chlorine acid can refer to:

- Hydrochloric acid, HCl
- Hypochlorous acid, HClO
- Chlorous acid, HClO_{2}
- Chloric acid, HClO_{3}
- Perchloric acid, HClO_{4}

== Gallery ==
Chlorine acids
Molecular structure of hydrochloric acid.

Molecular structure of hypochlorous acid.

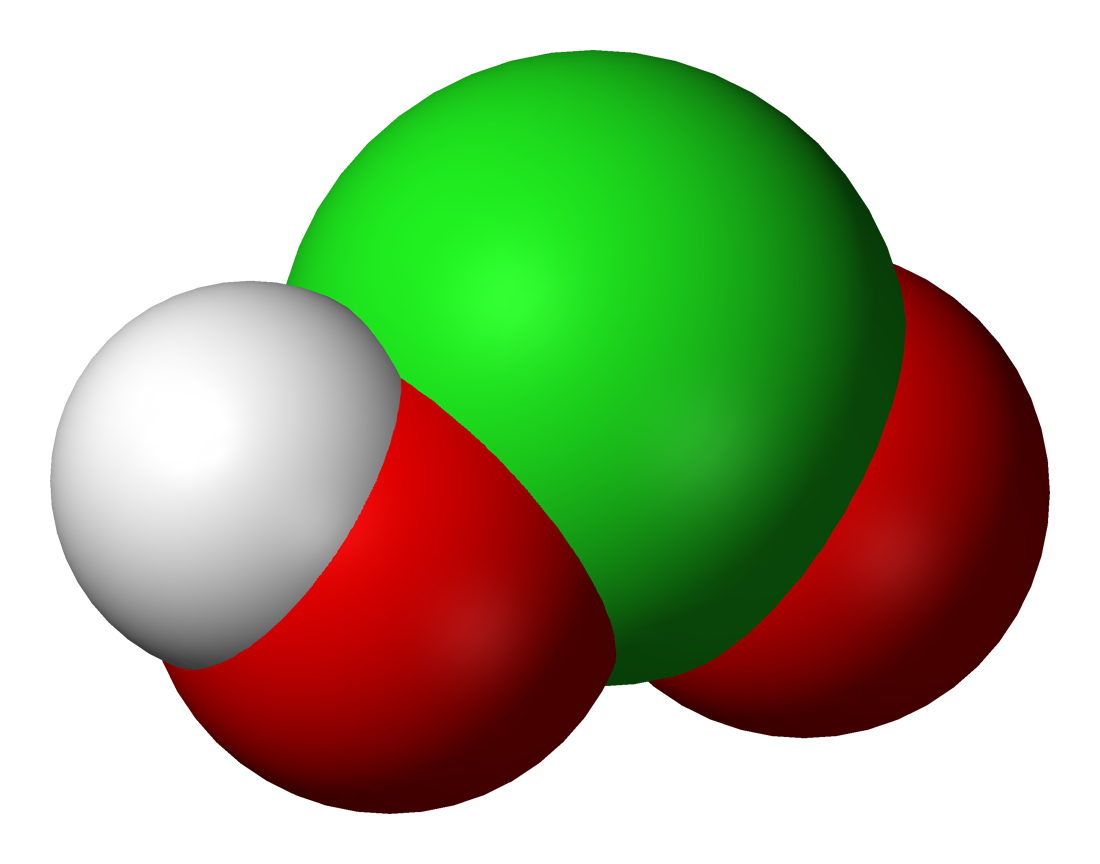
Molecular structure of chlorous acid.

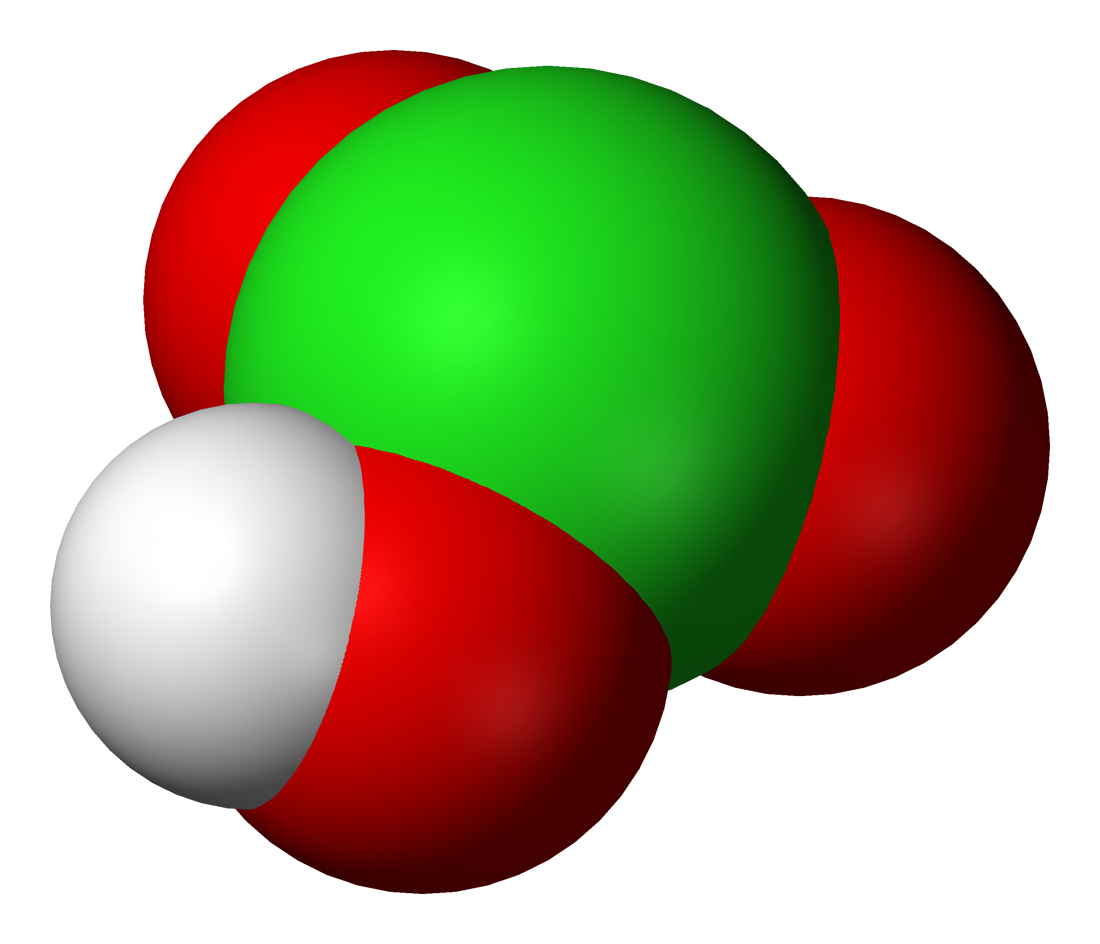
Molecular structure of chloric acid.

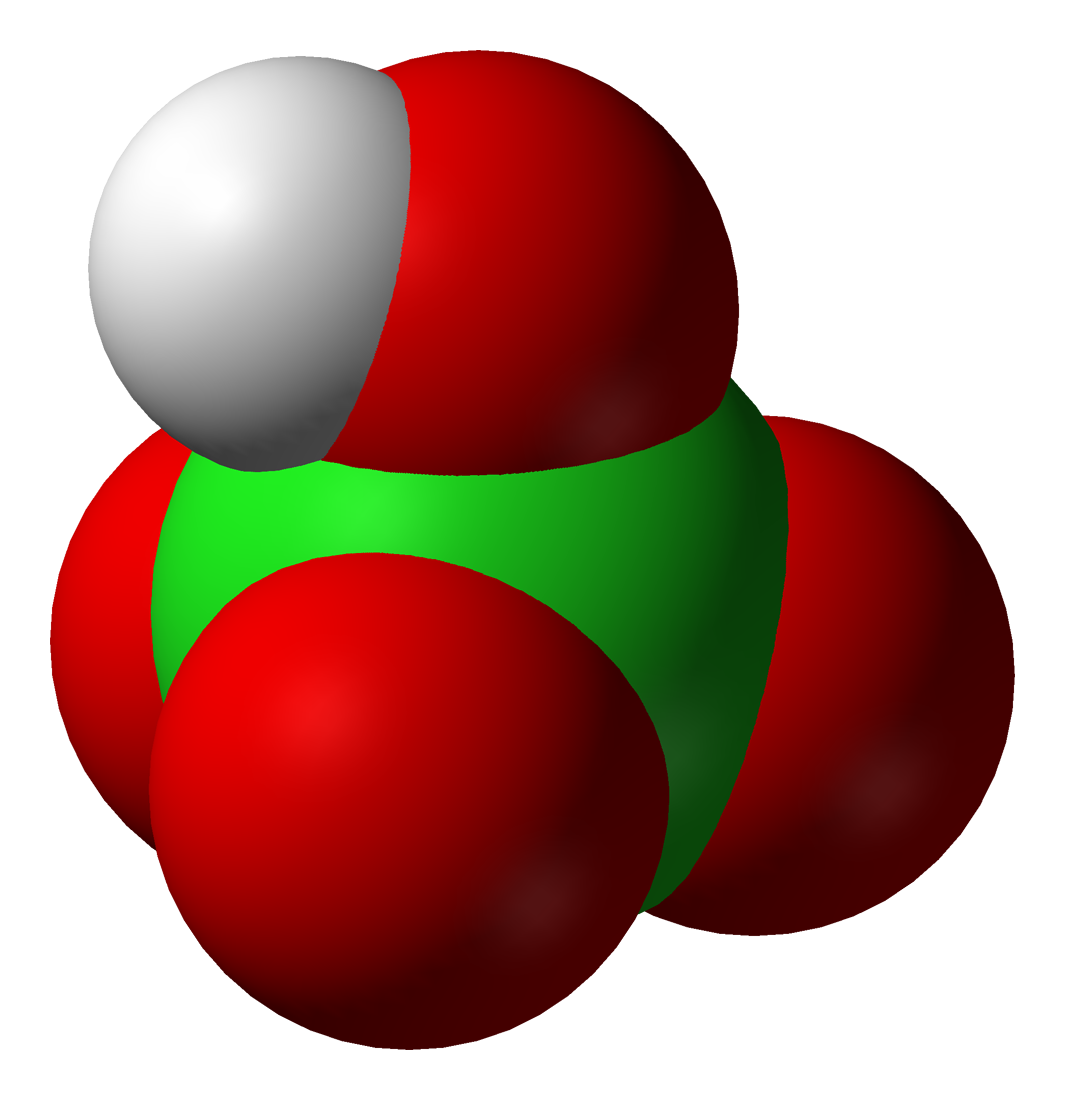
Molecular structure of perchloric acid.
