= Capital Bank (Jordan) =

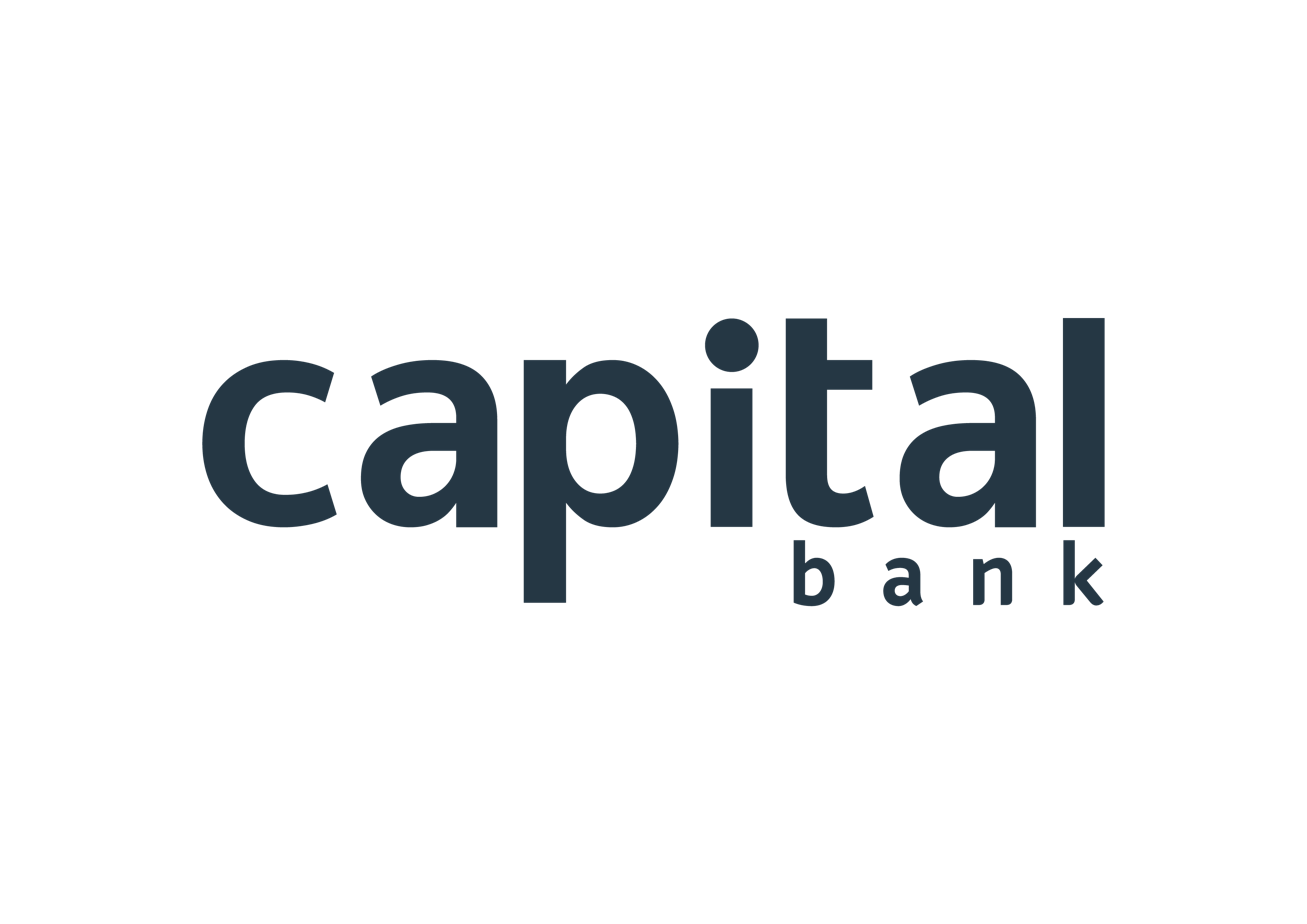
- Type: Private
- Traded as: Capital Bank
- Founded: 1995
- Headquarters: Amman, Jordan
- Area served: Jordan, Iraq, KSA, UAE
- Products: Retail and Individual Banking products and solutions
- Revenue: JOD 346.9 million
- Net income: JOD 106.6 million
- Total assets: JOD 7.6 billion
- Total equity: JOD 728 million
- Number of employees: 2,400
- Subsidiaries: National Bank of Iraq (NBI), Capital Invest, Blink
- Website: Capitalbank.jo

The Capital Bank of Jordan (CBoJ) commonly known as Capital Bank, is a private sector bank operating in Jordan and Iraq. Established in 1995 as Export & Finance Bank, the bank sells a range of products and services across retail and corporate banking divisions. It is described by independent experts as "a boutique bank focused on corporate clients", and has a separate division for SME lending. Capital Bank owns a majority share (62%) in the National Bank of Iraq (NBI).

As of September 2016 the bank had JOD1,964mn (USD2.77 billion) of consolidated assets and total capital of JOD329mn (USD463mn)

In 2021, Capital Bank Group acquired Bank Audi’s operations in both Jordan and Iraq, and in February 2022, Capital Bank acquired Societe Generale Bank Jordan.

In February 2022, Capital Bank also Launched Blink which is a Digital Neo Bank.

In June 2022, Capital Bank raised its capital by issuing new shares in favor of the Public Investment Fund (PIF) as a strategic investor in Capital Bank with a 23.97% stake
