= Zaatari refugee camp =

Camp for Syrian refugees in Jordan

Zaatari مخيم الزعتري
- Refugee camp
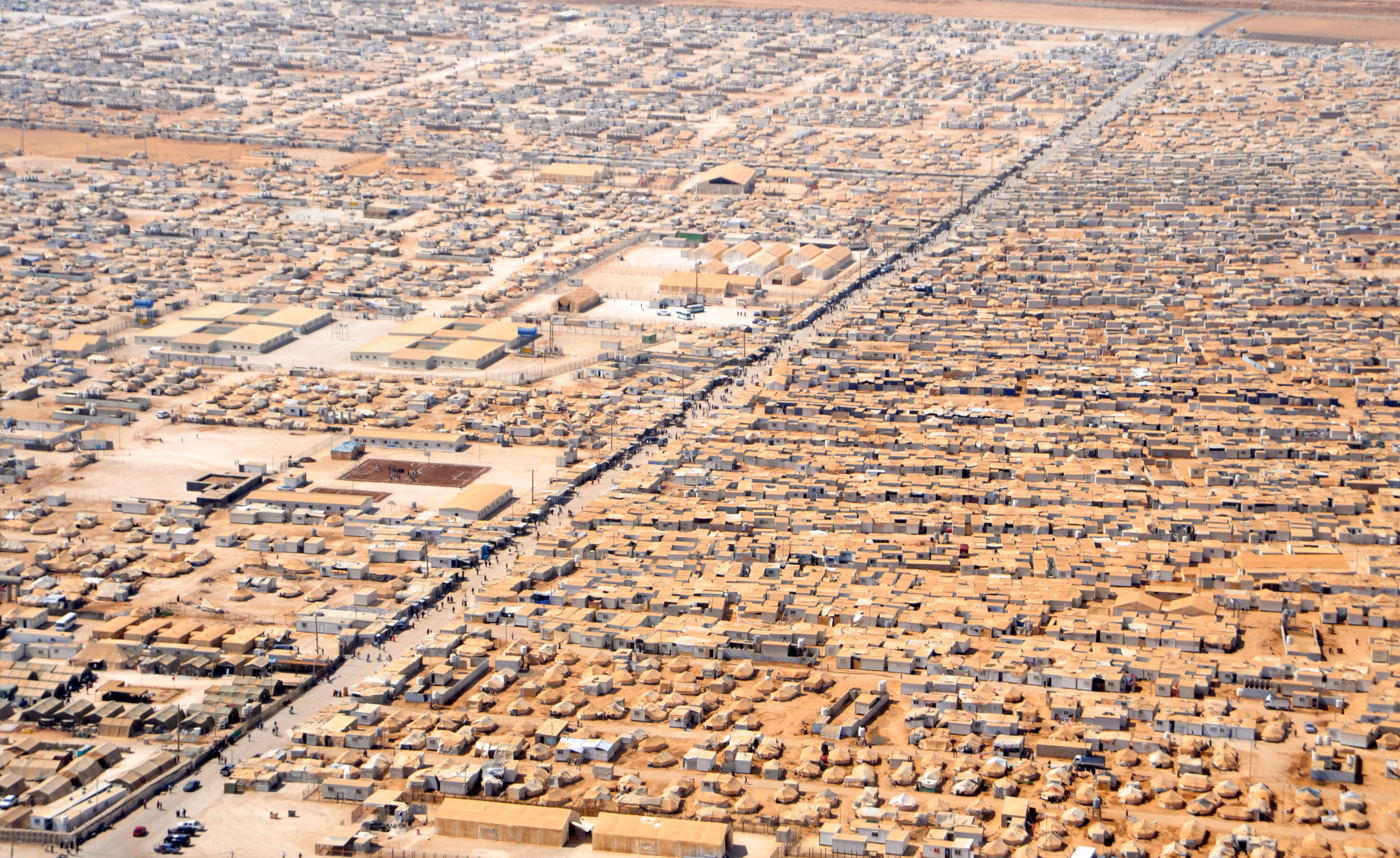

- Location in Jordan
- Coordinates: 32°17′44.4″N 36°19′25.5″E
- Country: Jordan
- Governorate: Mafraq Governorate
- Settled: July 2012

Government
  - Camp Manager from SRAD and Head of Sub-Office from UNHCR: The camp is jointly led by UNHCR the UN Refugee Agency and SRAD The Syrian Refugee Affairs Directorate

Area
  - Total: 2.0 sq mi (5.2 km^{2})

Population (30 Sep 2024)
  - Total: 77,298
  - Density: 62,710/sq mi (24,212/km^{2})
- density figure from 2 January 2018 (UNHCR), population figure from stated date
- Time zone: UTC+2 (UTC+3)
  - Summer (DST): UTC+3 (UTC+3)
- Area code: +(962)
- Website: www.unhcr.org

The Zaatari refugee camp, also "Za'atari camp", (Arabic: مخيم الزعتري, romanized: Mukhayyam al-Za'atari) is a refugee camp, located in Jordan, which has become a settlement. In terms of size, it is the world's largest camp for Syrian refugees. It was first opened on 28 July 2012 to host Syrians fleeing the violence in the ongoing Syrian War that erupted in March 2011. It is connected to the road network by a short road which leads to Highway 10.

Early on, the primary issues were inadequate food supplies and housing. In 2013 it was reported that the camp was experiencing growing crime. Demonstrations were or are used as a forum to create awareness of the conflict; they were also to express political views against the then government of Bashar al-Assad and the violence inflicted by the Syrian Armed Forces. Due to the maximum capacity of 60,000 refugees, in March 2013 a second camp was built 20 kilometres east of Zarqa in the Marjeeb Al Fahood plains. On 5 April 2014 a riot resulted in one refugee being killed by gunshot as well as a number of injuries to both refugees and Jordanian police.

== Demographics ==
Accurate counting of the number of refugees in the camp stopped during March 2013 due to the high influx of refugees that skyrocketed that month. The figures during the initial days varied slightly from day to day due to people 'escaping' or leaving the camp back to Syria, and partly due to initial over-counting. Movement out of the camp is not restricted, but it is managed through a temporary leave permits.

=== Population growth ===
Since the opening of the refugee camp in July 2012, the camp saw a dramatic increase in its population, that made it the largest population center in Mafraq Governorate within a few months:

- On 27 August 2012, the number of refugees in the camp reached 15,000 refugees, comprising about 10% of the total number of Syrian refugees in Jordan.
- The camp was housing 30,000 Syrian refugees as of 6 September 2012 comprising about 30% of the total Syrian refugees in Jordan.

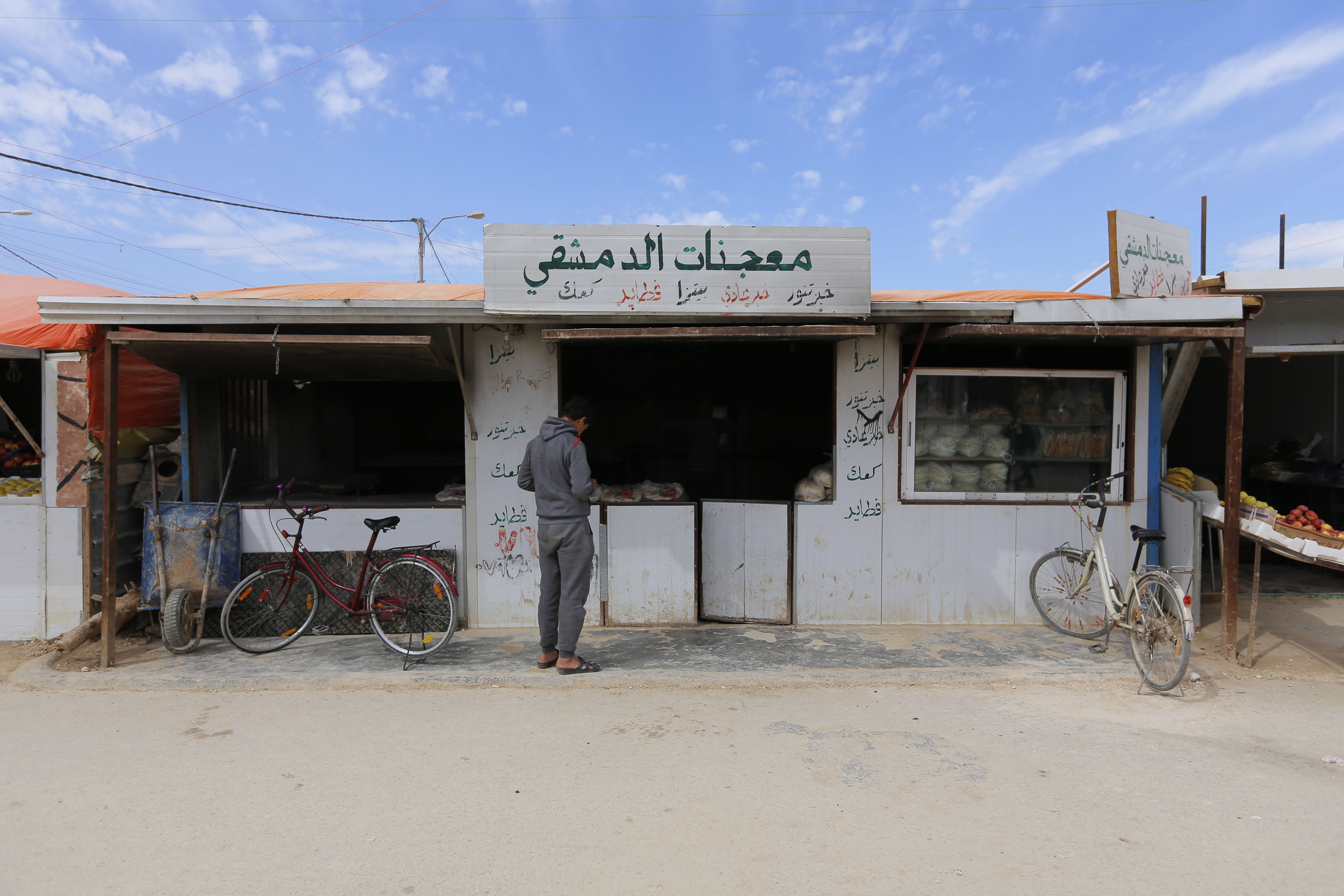
A bakery shop made by the residents of Al-Za'tari camp for Syrian refugees in Jordan. Many Syrian refugees have started their businesses in the camp for living, which created a popular market in the camp. (By/ Mustafa Bader)

- On 29 November 2012 the number of refugees reached 45,000, while the total number of Syrian refugees in Jordan was approximately 230,000.
- On 10 January 2013 the total camp population reached 65,000 comprising 22% of the total Syrian refugees in Jordan.
- On 5 February 2013 the number of refugees in the camp reached 76,000, while the total number of Syrian refugees in Jordan was more than 345,000.
- In March 2013, the Syrian security forces started a large-scale security campaign in the southern regions of Syria, resulting in a significant increase in the refugees crossing the borders to Jordan. By 11 March there were more than 156,000 refugees in the camp. These estimates made Zataari possibly the fourth largest city in Jordan at the time.
- On 30 April 2014, another refugee camp was opened in Azraq. All newly arrived refugees are now taken to Azraq, while the number of refugees in Zaatari had steadily depleted. By September 2014, the number of refugees in Zaatari had fallen to 79,000, according to the latest figures from the UNHCR.
- On 26 March 2015, the camp population was estimated at 83,000 refugees. The August 2015 estimate was about 79,900.
- On 31 October 2018, the population housed about 78,357 refugees, of whom nearly 20% were under five years old. 20% of households were headed by females.
- On 30 September 2024, there was a registered population of 77,298 refugees in the camp.
- As of January 2026, the number of refugees living in Zaatari Camp has dropped down to 51,000. This significant change comes as a result of the fall of the Assad Regime in Syria back in December 2024. The number of refugees in Jordan according to UNHCR has dropped to around 400,000 ever since up to January 2026.

== Energy ==
The largest solar plant ever built in a refugee camp went live on 13 November 2016, estimated to reduce annual carbon dioxide emissions from the camp by 13,000 metric tonnes per year, equivalent to 30,000 barrels of oil and saving US$5.5 million annually. The 12.9 megawatt peak solar photovoltaic plant was funded by the German government, through the KfW Development Bank at a cost of 15 million euros (US$17.5 million). It provides families with between 12 and 14 hours electricity each day - longer than previously.

== Funding, administration and services ==
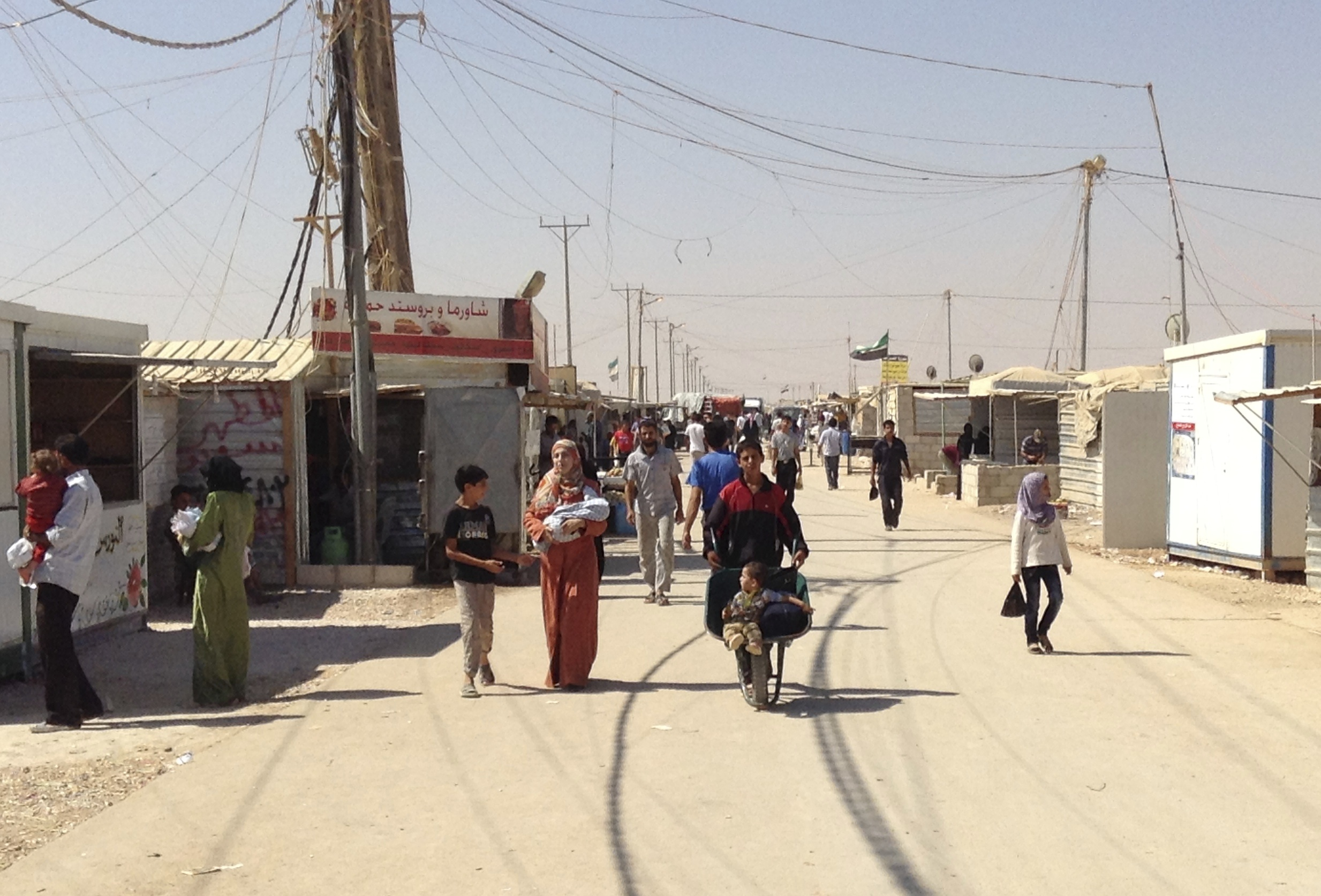
Zaatari refugee camp

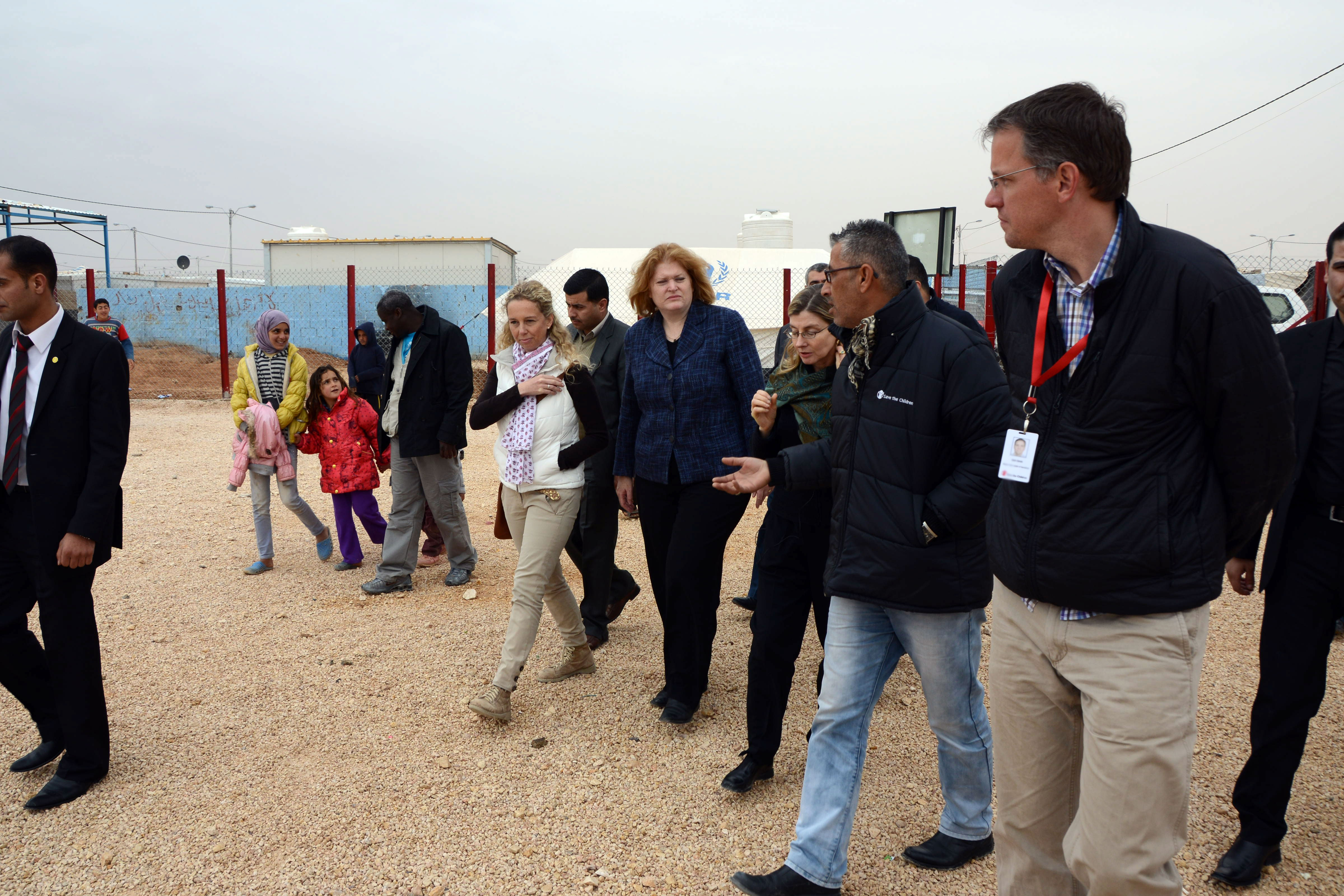
USAID personnel visit the camp

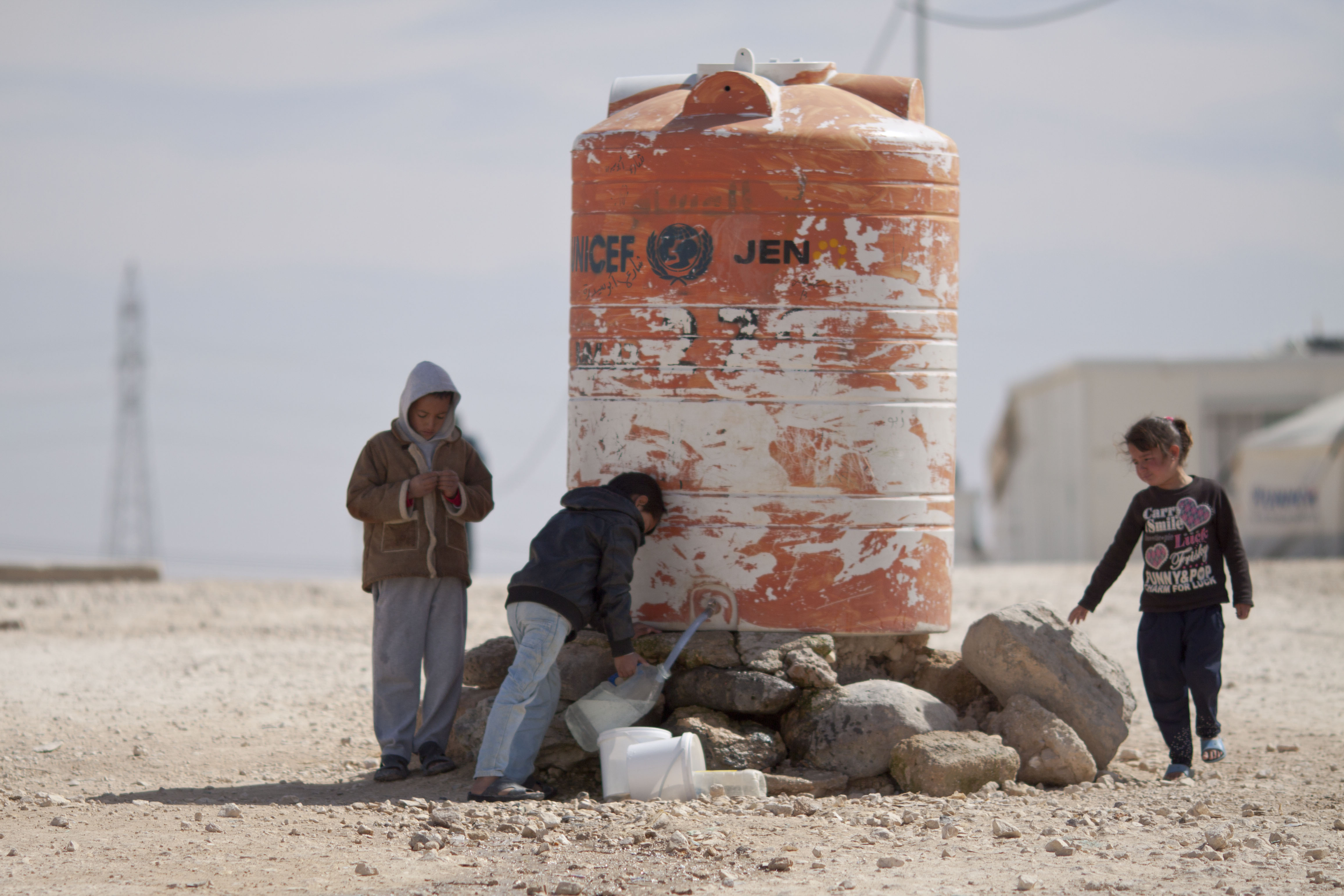
Syrian children filling drinking water in bottles at Al-Zaatari camp for Syrian refugees in Jordan (By/ Mustafa Bader)

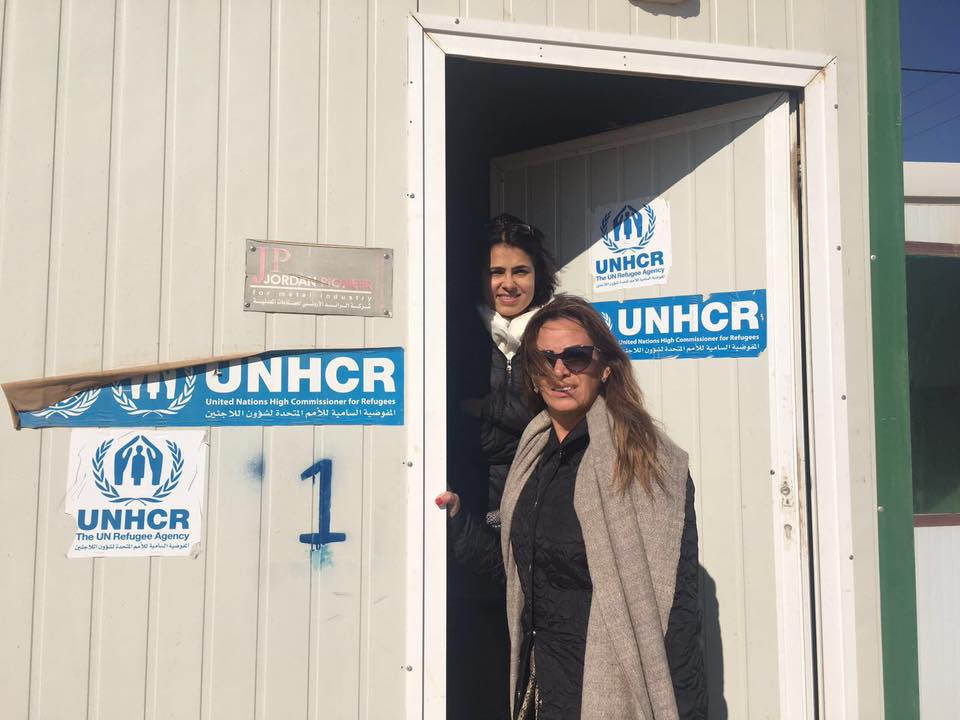
Iman Mutlaq visits the Zaatari refugee camp for implementing psychosocial support by the IAHV, Jordan; co-funded by the European Union for the Syrian refugees.

As a host country, Jordan is estimated to spend $870 million a year supporting Syrian refugees; if treated as a traditional donor, it would have contributed 5,622% of its fair share. The camp is under joint administration of the Syrian Refugee Affairs Directorate and UNHCR.

Community mobilization:

- Save the Children Jordan

Medical:

- Arabian Medical Relief
- International Medical Corps
- Syrian American Medical Society (SAMS)
- Jordan Health Aid Society International (JHASi), partnering with UNHCR
- IFH Noor Al-Hussein Foundation, Partner with UNHCR, UNFPA
- Two clinics operated by UNFPA for primary health care and reproductive health care

WASH (Water/Sanitation/Hygiene) coordination and overall responsibility:

- UNICEF

Water and sanitation facilities:

- MercyCorps
- Oxfam
- UNICEF has helped to construct a water network.

Food:

- World Food Programme (WFP)

Hygiene promotion:

- ACTED responsibility lies in the field of water treatment, water testing and waste management (liquid and solid).
- Oxfam

Education:

- UNICEF
- SCJ/Save the Children - Jordan "is working to enroll children of Syrian refugees in the Zaatari Refugee Camp in schools" as a part of "the educational outreach programme".
- Mercy Corps - provides non-formal and psychosocial support for children (ages 5–17) in Za'atari camp, with a specific focus on inclusive education programs for children and youth with disabilities.
- International Rescue Committee (IRM) is active in assessing the extent of gender based violence.
- UNFPA (United Nations Population Fund)
- Norwegian Refugee Council - provides informal education services.

Women's and children's protection:

- UNFPA
- UN Women
- International Rescue Committee(IRC) - operates four women's centres and works with UNICEF to care for unaccompanied and separated children.

Others:

- International Committee of the Red Cross - traces families and relatives of refugees.

By 2016 Zaatari refugee camp was gradually moving away from a model of top-down service provision, as is usual with refugee camps administered by international humanitarian organisations. Instead, under the aegis of the UNHCR, the camp was transforming into a self-provisioning urban conglomeration, where refugees are provided with various forms of cash-based assistance and encouraged to address their own needs.

=== Mapping ===
As at March 2018, Zaatari shelters and other structures had been mapped more than 25 times using satellite imagery by UNOSAT. Zaatari is one of the first camps to be mapped in detail through OpenStreetMap.

== See also ==
- List of Syrian refugee camps in Jordan
- Mrajeeb Al Fhood refugee camp
- Syrians in Jordan
