= Amman Stock Exchange =

Stock exchange located in Amman, Jordan

- Type: Stock Exchange
- Location: Amman, Jordan
- Founded: 1999; 27 years ago
- Owner: Autonomy
- Key people: Ghassan Mohammed Kheir Omet (Chairman); Mazen Wathaifi (CEO)
- Currency: JOD
- No. of listings: 237 (2014)
- Market cap: JOD 18.1 billion (2014)
- Volume: JOD 2.2 billion (2014)
- Indices: 2165.5 +%4.82(2014)
- Website: exchange.jo

Amman Stock Exchange (ASE) is a stock exchange private institution in Jordan, based in Amman.

== History ==
The ASE was established in March 1999 as a non-profit, private institution with administrative and financial autonomy. It is authorized to function as an exchange for the trading of securities. The exchange is governed by a seven-member board of directors. A chief executive officer oversees day-to-day responsibilities and reports to the board. The members of ASE are Jordan's 68 brokerage firms.

Amman Stock Exchange became state-owned company under the name "The Amman Stock Exchange Company (ASE Company)" on February 20, 2017.

The ASE is committed to the principles of fairness, transparency, efficiency, and liquidity. It seeks to provide a secure environment for its listed securities while protecting investors' rights. To provide this, the ASE has implemented internationally recognized directives concerning market divisions and listing criteria.

To comply with international standards and best practices, the ASE works closely with the Jordan Securities Commission JSC on surveillance matters and maintains strong relationships with other exchanges, associations, and international organizations. The exchange is an active member of the Arab Federation of Exchanges, Federation of Euro-Asian Stock Exchanges (FEAS) and a full member of the World Federation of Exchanges (WFE).

The ASE is charged with providing enterprises with a means of raising capital by listing on the Exchange, encouraging an active market in listed securities based on the effective determination of prices and fair and transparent trading, providing modern and effective facilities and equipment for trading the recording of trades and publication of prices, monitoring and regulating market trading, coordination with the JSC as necessary, to ensure compliance with the law, a fair market and investor protection, setting out and enforcing a professional code of ethics among its member directors and staff, and ensuring the provision of timely and accurate information of issuers to the market and disseminating market information to the public.

== Leadership ==
- Kamal Ahmad Al-Qudah – Chairman
- Mazen Wathaifi – CEO

== Listed securities ==
- Stocks
- Bonds
- Right Issues

== Indexes ==
The ASE's stock indices include the ASE Unweighted Index, the ASE Market Capitalization Weighted Index and the ASE Free Float Index.

== Bulletins ==
- Daily Bulletin
- Weekly Bulletin
- Monthly Bulletins
- Yearly Bulletins
- Monthly Statistical

== See also ==
- Economy of Jordan
- List of stock exchanges in Western Asia
- List of stock exchanges
