= Economy of Jordan =

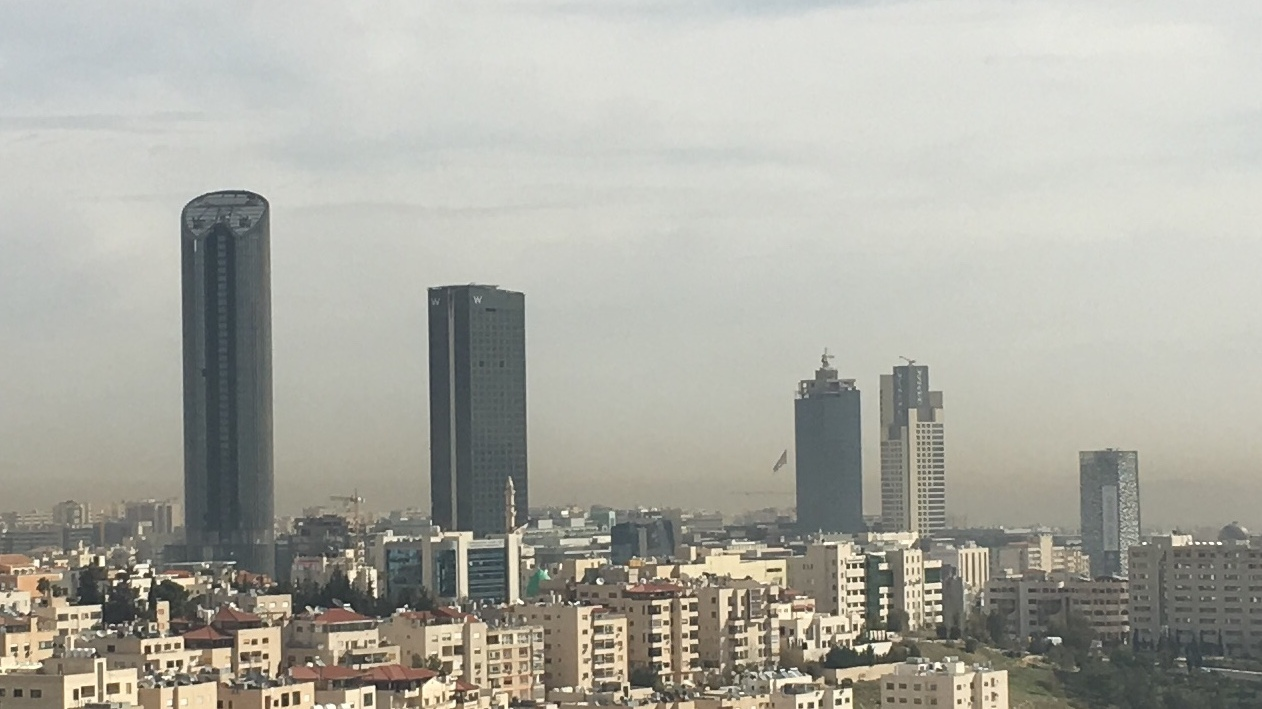
- New Abdali in Amman
- Currency: Jordanian dinar (JOD)
- Fiscal year: Calendar Year
- Trade organisations: WTO, CAEU, G77
- Country group: Upper-middle income country

Statistics
- GDP: ▲$64.91 billion (nominal; 2026); ▲$153.65 billion (PPP; 2026)
- GDP rank: 94st (nominal; 2026); 95th (PPP; 2026)
- GDP growth: 2.5% (2024); 2.6% (2025)
- GDP per capita: ▲$5,600 (nominal; 2026); ▲$13,260 (PPP; 2026)
- GDP per capita rank: 145th (nominal; 2026); 136st (PPP; 2026)
- GDP per capita growth: 1.5% (2024)
- GDP by sector: agriculture: 4.5%; industry: 28.8%; services: 66.6%; (2017 est.)
- Inflation (CPI): 4.224% (2022)
- Population below national poverty line: 14.4% (2010, World Bank); 18.1% on less than $5.50/day (2010)
- Gini coefficient: 35.4 medium (2013)
- Human Development Index: ▲0.754 high (2023) (100th); ▲0.637 medium IHDI (2023) (77th)
- Labour force: ▲2,631,115 (2019); ▼32.1% employment rate (2014)
- Labour force by occupation: agriculture: 2%; industry: 20%; services: 78%; (2013 est.)
- Unemployment: ▲18.3% (2017 est.); note: official rate; unofficial rate is approximately 30%
- Youth unemployment: ▼38.9% (2025)
- Main industries: tourism, information technology, clothing, fertilizer, potash, phosphate mining, pharmaceuticals, petroleum refining, cement, inorganic chemicals, light manufacturing

External
- Exports: ▼$10.5 billion (2024)
- Export goods: textiles, fertilizers, potash, phosphates, vegetables, pharmaceuticals
- Main export partners: United States 32.1%; GCC 18.7%; Saudi Arabia 14.3%; Kuwait 2.02%; Qatar 1.67%; India 16%; EU 6.54%; Germany 0.99%; Netherlands 0.86%; China 4.22%; Israel 3.52%; Egypt 2.44% (2024)
- Imports: ▼$21.1 billion (2024)
- Import goods: crude oil, refined petroleum products, machinery, transport equipment, iron, cereals
- Main import partners: China 22.8%; EU 19.9%; Germany 4.32%; Italy 3.26%; Netherlands 2.17%; GCC 11.3%; Saudi Arabia 10.1%; Kuwait 0.65%; United States 8.32%; Turkey 4.92%; India 4.52%; Egypt 3.56% (2024)
- FDI stock: ▲$33.83 billion (31 December 2017 est.); ▲ Abroad: $646.5 million (31 December 2017 est.)
- Current account: ▼ −$4.257 billion (2017 est.)
- Gross external debt: ▲$29.34 billion (31 December 2017 est.)

Public finance
- Government debt: ▲95.9% of GDP (2017 est.) (Note: data cover central government debt, and include debt instruments issued (or owned) by government entities other than the treasury; the data include treasury debt held by foreign entities; the data exclude debt issued by subnational entities, as well as intra-governmental debt; intra-governmental debt consists of treasury borrowings from surpluses in the social funds, such as for retirement, medical care, and unemployment; debt instruments for the social funds are not sold at public auctions)
- Foreign reserves: ▲$15.56 billion (31 December 2017 est.)
- Budget balance: −5.1% (of GDP) (2017 est.)
- Revenue: 9.462 billion (2017 est.)
- Spending: 11.51 billion (2017 est.)
- Credit rating: Standard & Poor's: BB+ (Domestic); BB (Foreign); BBB- (T&C Assessment); Outlook: Negative; Moody's: Ba2; Outlook: Negative
- All values, unless otherwise stated, are in US dollars.

The economy of Jordan is classified by the World Food Programme as an upper-middle income mixed economy, as well as being poor in resources with limited land for agriculture. Since the 1990s, Jordan has had high unemployment, poverty, and inequality. As of 2023, Jordan has a GDP of US$50.85 billion, ranking it 89th worldwide.

Jordan has free trade agreements with the United States, Canada, Singapore, Malaysia, the European Union, Tunisia, Algeria, Libya, Turkey and Syria. More free trade agreements were planned with Iraq, the Palestinian Authority, the GCC, Lebanon, and Pakistan. Jordan is a member of the Greater Arab Free Trade Agreement, the Euro-Mediterranean free trade area, the Agadir Agreement, and also enjoys advanced status with the EU.

Jordan's economic resource base centers on phosphates, potash, and their fertilizer derivatives; tourism; overseas remittances; and foreign aid. These are its principal sources of hard currency earnings. Lacking coal reserves, hydroelectric power, large tracts of forest or commercially viable oil deposits, Jordan relies on natural gas for 93% of its domestic energy needs. Jordan used to depend on Iraq for oil until the American-led 2003 invasion of Iraq. Jordan has industrial zones producing goods in the textile, aerospace, defense, ICT, pharmaceutical, and cosmetic sectors.

The main obstacles to Jordan's economy are scarce water supplies, complete reliance on oil imports for energy, regional instability, and the authoritarian regime. Just over 10% of its land is arable and the water supply is limited. Rainfall is low and highly variable, and much of Jordan's available ground water is not renewable. After King Abdullah II's accession to the throne in 1999, liberal economic policies were introduced.

Jordan's total foreign debt in 2011 was $19 billion, representing 60% of its GDP. In 2016, the debt reached $35.1 billion representing 93.4% of its GDP. This was attributed to regional instability, causing a decrease in tourist activity and foreign investments along with increased military expenditure. Other factors were attacks on the Egyptian pipeline supplying the Kingdom with gas, the collapse of trade with Iraq and Syria; expenses from hosting Syrian refugees and accumulated interest from loans. According to the World Bank, Syrian refugees cost Jordan more than $2.5 billion a year, amounting to 6% of the GDP and 25% of the government's annual revenue.

Wage growth declined due to competition for jobs between refugees and Jordan citizens. The downturn that began in 2011 continued until 2018. The country's top five contributing sectors to its GDP, government services, finance, manufacturing, transport, and tourism and hospitality were badly impacted by the Syrian civil war. Foreign aid covered only a small part of these costs. 63% of the total costs were covered by Jordan. An austerity programme was adopted by the government to reduce Jordan's debt-to-GDP ratio to 77% by 2021. The programme succeeded in preventing the debt from rising above 95% of the GDP in 2018. The yearly growth rate of the economy was 2% from 2016 to 2019, compared to 6.4% from 2000 to 2009.

On 15 May 2025 Jordan and the UAE activated their Comprehensive Economic Partnership Agreement (CEPA), marking a significant step in strengthening bilateral economic ties. Signed in 2023 under the leadership of King Abdullah II and President Sheikh Mohamed bin Zayed, the agreement aims to boost trade, reduce tariffs, and enhance investment across key sectors such as industry, renewable energy, and tourism. It establishes frameworks for cooperation, including a joint investment council, and targets increasing non-oil trade to over $8 billion by 2032. As the UAE's first CEPA with an Arab country, the deal underscores a shared commitment to regional integration, SME empowerment, and long-term economic partnership.

== History ==
Following independence in 1946, Jordan was a predominantly agrarian society. The economy faced a massive structural shock following the 1967 Arab-Israeli War. The occupation of the West Bank by Israel resulted in the loss of 40% of the country's farming income, 80% of its tourism revenue, and forced roughly 360,000 refugees into the East Bank, which increased the population by a third almost overnight.

Jordan's economy grew rapidly with a growth rate averaging 9% annually between 1975 and 1980 that was fueled by remittances from Jordanians working in Gulf states and direct financial grants from oil-rich Arab nations. In the late 1980s, falling oil prices led to a reduction in Gulf aid. This caused a recession in Jordan, a sharp rise in government debt, and led to structural adjustment programs and economic riots.

The 1991 Gulf War led to the return of hundreds of thousands of Jordanians, which stimulated a short-term GDP growth spurt of 11.1% in 1992. Throughout the late 1990s, under guidance from the IMF, Jordan began phasing out food and fuel subsidies to reduce massive budget deficits. In the early 2000s and mid-2000s, Jordan experienced impressive growth, peaking near 6.8% annually, heavily driven by foreign direct investment from Gulf countries and the development of major real estate and tourism projects.

The 2008 global financial crisis and the outbreak of the Syrian civil war significantly slowed Jordan's economic momentum. The influx of over 650,000 Syrian refugees placed a heavy burden on public services and infrastructure.

== Currency ==
The Central Bank of Jordan commenced operations in 1964 and is the sole issuer of Jordanian currency, the Jordanian dinar, which is pegged to the US dollar. The following chart of the trend of gross domestic product of Jordan at market prices by the International Monetary Fund with figures in millions of Jordanian dinars.

Year	Gross domestic product (JD million)	$US exchange	Inflation index (2000=100)
1980	1,165	0.29 Jordanian dinars	35
1985	1,971	0.39 Jordanian dinars	45
1990	2,761	0.66 Jordanian dinars	70
1995	4,715	0.70 Jordanian dinars	87
2005	9,118	0.70 Jordanian dinars	112

For purchasing power parity comparisons, the Jordanian dinar is exchanged per US dollar at 0.710.

Jordan's population is 6,342,948 and mean wages were $4.19 per man-hour in 2009.

== Economic overview ==
Jordan is classified by the UN as an "Upper-middle-income country." Jordan ranked as having the 35th best infrastructure in the world, according to the World Economic Forum's Index of Economic Competitiveness. The Kingdom scored higher than many of its peers in the Persian Gulf and Europe like Kuwait, Israel and Ireland. The 2010 AOF Index of Globalization ranked Jordan as the most globalized country in the Middle East and North Africa region. Jordan's banking sector is classified as "highly developed" by the IMF along with the GCC economies and Lebanon.

The official currency in Jordan is the Jordanian dinar and divides into 100 qirsh (also called piastres) or 1000 fils. Since 23 October 1995, the dinar has been officially pegged to the IMF's special drawing rights (SDRs). In practice, it is fixed at 1 US$ = 0.709 dinar, which translates to approximately 1 dinar = 1.41044 dollars. The Central Bank buys US dollars at 0.708 dinar, and sell US dollars at 0.7125 dinar, Exchangers buys US dollars at 0.708 and sell US dollars at 0.709.

In 2011, the Jordanian market was considered one of the most developed Arab markets outside the Persian Gulf. Jordan ranked 18th on the 2012 Global Retail Development Index which lists the 30 most attractive retail markets in the world. Jordan was ranked as the 19th most expensive country in the world to live in 2010 and the most expensive Arab country to live in.

Jordan has been a member of the World Trade Organization since 2000. In the 2009 Global Enabling Trade Report, Jordan ranked 4th in the Arab World behind the UAE, Bahrain, and Qatar. The free trade agreement with the United States that went into effect in December 2001 phased out duties on nearly all goods and services by 2010.

=== Unemployment ===
Jordan has high unemployment rates, 11.9% in the fourth quarter of 2010 but some estimate it to be as high as a quarter of the working-age population. Unemployment reached 25% in 2021, the highest level in more than 25 years, 6% points more than in 2019, and more than double the amount in 2011. Unemployment is a major issue, particularly for young people, women, and those with a university degree, with rates of unemployment exceeding 45%, 30%, and 30%, respectively.

==== Youth unemployment ====
There are 15 million unemployed young men in Arab communities. The youth unemployment rate in Jordan has traditionally been much higher than other countries. In the past ten years, the rate has stayed around 23%. There has been a recent increase in the popular belief that unemployment is the fault of the individual and not a societal problem. However, youth unemployment has also been attributed to increased pressure on service sectors that typically employ more youth in Jordan. Youth unemployment has led to later and later ages of marriage in Jordan, which some view as one of the most important consequences of the phenomenon. Another consequence experienced in Jordan is increased mental health problems. In 2019, the estimated youth unemployment rate in Jordan was at 35%.

=== Remittances to Jordan ===
The flows of remittance to Jordan experienced rapid growth, particularly in the late 1970s and 1980s, when Jordan started exporting high skilled labour to the Persian Gulf States. The money that migrants send home, remittances, is an important source of external funding for many developing countries, including Jordan. With about US$3000 million in remittances in 2010, Jordan was in 10th place among developing countries according to World Bank data. Jordan has ranked constantly among the top 20 remittances-recipient countries over the last decade. In addition, the Arab Monetary Fund (AMF) statistics in 2010 indicate that Jordan was the third biggest recipient of remittances among Arab countries after Egypt and Lebanon. The host countries that have absorbed most of the Jordanian expatriates are Saudi Arabia and the United Arab of Emirates (UAE), where the available recorded number of the Jordanian expatriates, working abroad, indicates that about 90% of these migrants are working in Persian Gulf countries. The proportion of skilled workers in Jordan is among the highest in the region. Many of the world's major software and hardware IT companies are present in Jordan. The presence of such firms underlines Jordan's attractiveness as a stable base with high-calibre human resources from which to serve the wider region. According to a report published in January 2012 by the founder of venture capital firm Finaventures, Rachid Sefraoui, Amman is one of the top 10 best cities in the world to launch a tech start-up.

An estimated 13.3% of citizens live under the poverty line. Since the mid-1970s, migrants' remittances are Jordan's most important source of foreign exchange, and a decisive factor in the country's economic development and the rising standard of living of the population.

Agriculture in Jordan constituted almost 40% of GNP in the early 1950s; on the eve of the June 1967 War, it was 17%. By the mid-1980s, agriculture's share of GNP in Jordan was only about 6%.

Jordan hosts SOFEX, the world's fastest growing and region's only special operations and homeland security exhibition and conference. Jordan is a regional and international provider of advanced military goods and services. The KADDB Industrial Park, specialized in defense manufacturing, was opened in September 2009 in Mafraq. By 2015, the park is expected to provide around 15,000 job opportunities whereas the investment volume is expected to reach JD500 million. A report by Strategic Foresight Group has calculated the opportunity cost of conflict for the Middle East from 1991 to 2010 at $12 trillion. Jordan's share in this is almost $84 billion.

Jordan had a 82.3% mobile phone penetration rate in 2025 and a 63% internet penetration rate. 97% of Jordanian households own at least one television set while 90% have satellite reception. Furthermore, 61% of Jordanian households own at least one personal computer or laptop.

According to an investment survey, Jordan ranked as the 9th best outsourcing destination worldwide. Amman is one of the top 10 cities in the world to launch a tech start-up in 2012 and is becoming referred to as the "Silicon Valley of the Middle East".

Jordan has hosted the World Economic Forum on the Middle East and North Africa six times and plans to hold it again at the Dead Sea for the seventh time in 2013. Amman also hosts the Mercedes Benz Fashion Week semiannually and is the only city in the region to hold such a prestigious event that is usually held by the likes of New York, Paris, and Milan.

=== Standard of living ===
Jordan is one of the most liberal countries in the Middle East allowing a debate to consider introducing a secular government. In the 2010 Human Development Index, Jordan was placed in the "high human development" bracket and came 7th among Arab countries, after the Persian Gulf states and Lebanon. The 2010 Quality of Life Index prepared by International Living magazine ranked Jordan second in the MENA with 55.0 points after Israel.

Decades of political stability and security and strict law enforcement make Jordan one of the top 10 countries worldwide in security. In the 2010 Newsweek "World's Best Countries" list, Jordan ranked 53rd worldwide, and 3rd among Arab countries after Kuwait and the UAE. Jordan is also among the top ten countries whose citizens feel safest walking the streets at night.

As of 2011, 63% of working Jordanians are insured with the Social Security Corporation, as well as 120,000 foreigners, with plans to include the rest of Jordanian workers both inside and outside the kingdom as well as students, housewives, business owners, and the unemployed. Only 1.6% of Jordanians make less than $2 a day, one of the lowest in the developing world according to the Human Poverty Index.

In the 2010 Gallup Global Wellbeing Survey, 30% of Jordanians described their financial situation as "thriving", surpassed most of the Arab countries with the exception of Qatar, the United Arab Emirates, Kuwait, and Saudi Arabia. In 2008, the Jordanian government launched the "Decent Housing for a Decent Living" project aimed at building 120,000 affordable housing units within the next 5 years, plus an additional 100,000 housing units if the need arises.

=== Main indicators ===
The following table shows the main economic indicators in 1980–2024. Inflation below 5% is in green.

Year	GDP (in bn. US$ PPP)	GDP per capita (in US$ PPP)	GDP (in bn. US$ nominal)	GDP growth (real)	Inflation (in percent)	Government debt (in % of GDP)
1980	8.82	3,978	3.93	▲11.1%	▲10.9%	n/a
1985	▲14.65	▲5,326	▲5.03	▼−1.1%	▲2.8%	n/a
1990	▲16.83	▼4,834	▼4.19	▼−1.6%	▲16.2%	▲227.5%
1995	▲24.31	▲5,453	▲6.76	▲6.0%	▲2.4%	▼117.8%
2000	▲31.00	▲6,131	▲8.73	▲4.2%	▲0.7%	▼99.3%
2005	▲47.66	▲8,392	▲13.13	▲8.8%	▲3.5%	▼73.0%
2006	▲53.31	▲8,774	▲15.80	▲8.5%	▲6.3%	▼66.3%
2007	▲59.34	▲9,166	▲17.96	▲8.4%	▲4.7%	▼64.3%
2008	▲64.95	▲9,792	▲22.65	▲7.4%	▲14.0%	▼54.2%
2009	▲68.63	▲10,122	▲24.54	▲5.0%	▲ -0.7%	▲58.0%
2010	▲71.07	▲10,254	▲27.13	▲2.3%	▲4.8%	▲59.4%
2011	▲74.52	▲10,482	▲29.52	▲2.7%	▲4.2%	▲62.1%
2012	▲77.76	▲10,782	▲31.68	▲2.4%	▲4.5%	▲70.5%
2013	▲81.14	▼10,545	▲34.50	▲2.6%	▲4.8%	▲75.6%
2014	▲85.35	▼9,858	▲36.90	▲3.4%	▲2.9%	▼75.0%
2015	▲88.29	▼9,300	▲38.64	▲2.5%	▲−0.9%	▲78.4%
2016	▲90.91	▼9,123	▲39.95	▲2.0%	▲−0.8%	▼77.4%
2017	▲94.83	▲9,283	▲41.67	▲2.5%	▲3.3%	▼75.7%
2018	▼94.60	▼9,045	▲43.43	▲1.9%	▲4.5%	▼74.3%
2019	▲100.63	▲9,405	▲44.57	▲1.8%	▲0.8%	▲78.0%
2020	▲104.08	▲9,524	▼43.76	▼−1.1%	▲0.3%	▲88.0%
2021	▼101.62	▼9,115	▲46.36	▲3.7%	▲1.3%	▲93.3%
2022	▲111.51	▲9,880	▲48.72	▲2.4%	▲4.2%	▼93.0%
2023	▲118.54	▲10,456	▲50.89	▲2.6%	▲2.1%	▼92.8%
2024	▲124.28	▲10,917	▲53.31	▲2.4%	▲2.1%	▼91.7%

== Sectors ==
=== Agriculture, forestry, and fishing ===
Despite increases in production, the agriculture sector's share of the economy has declined steadily to just 2.4% of gross domestic product by 2004. About 4% of Jordan's labor force worked in the agricultural sector in 2002. The most profitable segment of Jordan's agriculture is fruit and vegetable production (including tomatoes, cucumbers, citrus fruit, and bananas) in the Jordan Valley. The rest of crop production, especially cereal production, remains volatile because of the lack of consistent rainfall. Fishing and forestry are negligible in terms of the overall domestic economy. The fishing industry is evenly divided between live capture and aquaculture; the live weight catch totaled just over 1,000 metric tons in 2002. The forestry industry is even smaller in economic terms; approximately 240,000 total cubic meters of roundwood were removed in 2002, the vast majority for fuelwood.

==== Recent developments ====
Since gaining independence, Jordan's agricultural sector has experienced significant growth, with the added value of its production reaching JD1.691 billion and registering a 9% growth rate. Vegetable production has increased by 91%, and fruit tree produce has risen by 141%, expanding to meet both local and international demand. Jordanian agricultural products now reach 112 countries, with exports rising by 441% to JD1.5 billion. Livestock numbers have grown by 54%, totaling 3.8 million animals, and the value of animal products has increased by 279% to JD1.305 billion. Employment in the sector has grown by 38%, now encompassing 261,000 workers. The Agricultural Credit Corporation's capital has expanded by 213% to JD100 million, providing JD55 million in annual loans to 11,000 farmers. These developments underscore the sector's role in enhancing food security, economic integration, and job creation in rural areas.

=== Mining and minerals ===
Potash and phosphates are among the country's main economic exports. In 2003 approximately 2 million tons of potash salt production translated into US$192 million in export earnings, making it the second most lucrative exported good. Potash production totaled 1.9 million tons in 2004 and 1.8 million tons in 2005. In 2004 approximately 6.75 million tons of phosphate rock production generated US$135 million in export earnings, placing it fourth on Jordan's principal export list. With production totaling 6.4 million tons in 2005, Jordan was the world's third largest producer of raw phosphates. In addition to these two major minerals, smaller quantities of unrefined salt, copper ore, gypsum, manganese ore, and the mineral precursors to the production of ceramics (glass sand, clays, and feldspar) are also mined. As of June 2025, Jordan's Ministry of Industry announced that Jordan has enough wheat to meet local needs for the next ten months, and enough barley for the next eight months.

=== Industry and manufacturing ===
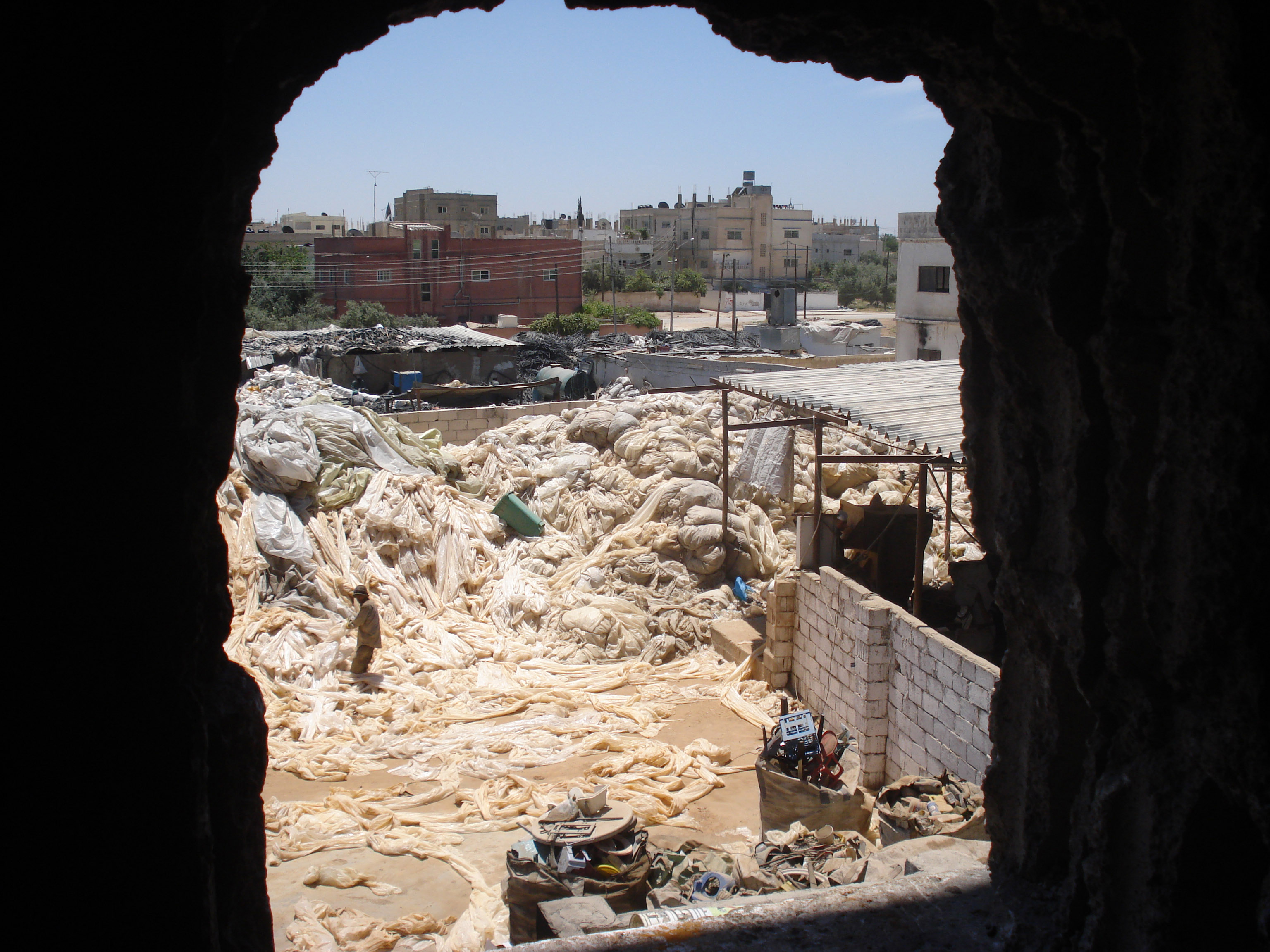
project recyclyng outside Amman.

The industrial sector, which includes mining, manufacturing, construction, and power, accounted for approximately 26% of gross domestic product in 2004 (including manufacturing 16.2%; construction 4.6%; and mining 3.1%). More than 21% of the country's labor force was reported to be employed in this sector in 2002. The main industrial products are potash, phosphates, pharmaceuticals, cement, clothes, and fertilizers. The most promising segment of this sector is construction. In the past several years, demand has increased rapidly for housing and offices of foreign enterprises based in Jordan to better access the Iraqi market. The manufacturing sector has grown as well (to nearly 20% of GDP by 2005), in large part as a result of the United States–Jordan Free Trade Agreement (ratified in 2001 by the U.S. Senate); the agreement has led to the establishment of approximately 13 qualifying industrial zones throughout the country. The zones, which provide duty-free access to the U.S. market, produce mostly light industrial products, especially ready-made garments. By 2004 the zones accounted for nearly US$1.1 billion in exports, according to the Jordanian government.

Jordan's free trade agreement with the US – the first in the Arab world – has already made the US one of Jordan's most significant markets. By 2010, it would have barrier-free export access in almost all sectors. A number of trade agreements with countries in the Middle Eastern and North African regions and beyond should also reap increasing benefits, not in the least the Agadir Agreement, which is seen as a precursor to a free trade agreement with the EU. Jordan also recently signed a free trade agreement with Canada. Furthermore, Jordan's plethora of industrial zones offering tax incentives, low utility costs and improved infrastructure links are helping incubate new developments. The relatively high skills level is also a key factor in promoting investment and stimulating the economy, particularly in value-added sectors. Despite the fact that Jordan has few natural resources it does benefit from abundant reserves of potash and phosphates, which are widely used in the production of fertilisers. Exports by these industries are expected to have a combined worth of $1bn in 2008. Other important industries include pharmaceuticals, which exported around $435m in 2006 and $260m in the first half of 2008 alone, as well as textiles, which were worth $1.19bn in 2007. Although the value of Jordan's industrial sector is high, the kingdom faces a number of challenges. Because the country is dependent on importing raw materials, it is vulnerable to price volatility. Shortages in water and power also make consistent development difficult. Despite these challenges, Jordan's economic openness and long-standing fertiliser and pharmaceutical industries should continue to provide a solid source of foreign currency.

Jordan has a plethora of industrial zones and special economic zones aimed at increasing exports and making Jordan an industrial giant. The Mafraq SEZ is focused on industry and logistics hoping to become the regional logistics hub with air, road, and rail links to neighboring countries and eventually Europe and the Persian Gulf. The Ma'an SEZ is primarily industrial focusing on satisfying domestic demand and reducing reliance on imports. With a national rail system under construction, Jordan expects trade to grow significantly and Jordan will mostly become the trade hub of the Levant and even the Middle East region as a whole due to its geography and natural resources.

==== Construction ====
Contributing an estimated JD477.5m ($678.05m), or 4.25% of Jordan's GDP, according to figures from the Central Bank, the construction sector performed strongly in 2007. The Great Amman Municipality (GAM) completed its master plan for the capital, which is expected to grow from 700 km^{2} today to 1700 km^{2} by 2025. Amman is changing from a predominantly horizontal to a largely vertical city due to various clusters of high-rises. Significant developments outside Amman include the rapid residential build-up of Zarqa, the transformation of Aqaba into a commercial and tourist centre, and the construction of a series of high-end hotels and tourist resorts along the Dead Sea. A new airport terminal, Amman ring road and a light rail between the capital and Zarqa are being constructed.

=== Energy ===
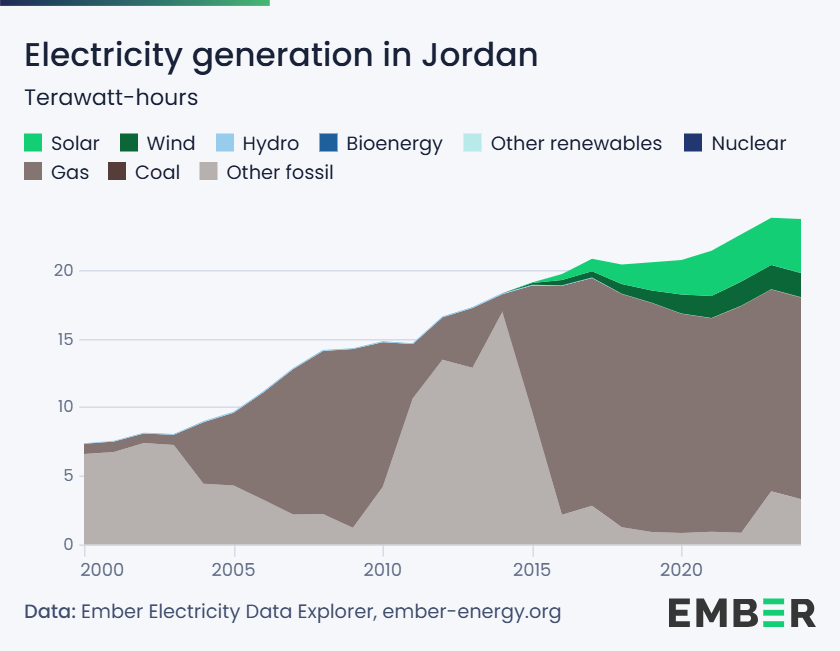
Electricity generation in Jordan in terawatt-hours

Energy remains perhaps the biggest challenge for continued growth for Jordan's economy. Spurred by the surge in the price of oil to more than $145 a barrel at its peak, the Jordanian government has responded with an ambitious plan for the sector. The country's lack of domestic resources is being addressed via a $14bn investment programme in the sector. The programme aims to reduce reliance on imported products from the current level of 96%, with renewables meeting 10% of energy demand by 2020 and nuclear energy meeting 60% of energy needs by 2035. The government also announced in 2007 that it would scale back subsidies in several areas, including energy, where there have historically been regressive subsidies for fuel and electricity. In another new step, the government is opening up the sector to competition, and intends to offer all the planned new energy projects to international tender.

Unlike most of its neighbors, Jordan has no significant petroleum resources of its own and is heavily dependent on oil imports to fulfill its domestic energy needs. Between the 1940s to the 1970s, oil was mainly transported through the Trans-Arabian Pipeline. In 2002 proved oil reserves totaled only 445,000 barrels (70,700 m^{3}). Jordan produced only 40 barrels per day (6.4 m^{3}/d) in 2004 but consumed an estimated 103,000 barrels per day (16,400 m^{3}/d). According to U.S. government figures, oil imports had reached about 100,000 barrels per day (16,000 m^{3}/d) in 2004. The Iraq invasion of 2003 disrupted Jordan's primary oil supply route from its eastern neighbor, which under Saddam Hussein had provided the kingdom with highly discounted crude oil via overland truck routes. Since late 2003, an alternative supply route by tanker through the Al Aqabah port has been established; Saudi Arabia is now Jordan's primary source of imported oil; Kuwait and the United Arab Emirates (UAE) are secondary sources. Although not so heavily discounted as Iraqi crude oil, supplies from Saudi Arabia and the UAE are subsidized to some extent.

In the face of continued high oil costs, interest has increased in the possibility of exploiting Jordan's vast oil shale resources, which are estimated to total approximately 40 billion tons, 4 billion tons of which are believed to be recoverable. Jordan's oil shale resources could produce 28 billion barrels (4.5 km^{3}) of oil, enabling production of about 100,000 barrels per day (16,000 m^{3}/d). The oil shale in Jordan has the fourth largest in the world which currently, there are several companies who are negotiating with the Jordanian government about exploiting the oil shale like Royal Dutch Shell, Petrobras and Eesti Energia.

Natural gas is increasingly being used to fulfill the country's domestic energy needs, especially with regard to electricity generation. Jordan was estimated to have only modest natural gas reserves (about 6 billion cubic meters in 2002), but new estimates suggest a much higher total. In 2003 the country produced and consumed an estimated 390 million cubic meters of natural gas. The primary source is located in the eastern portion of the country at the Risha gas field. Until the early 2010s, the country imported the bulk of its natural gas via the Arab Gas Pipeline that stretches from the Al Arish terminal in Egypt underwater to Al Aqabah and then to northern Jordan, where it links to two major power stations. This Egypt–Jordan pipeline supplied Jordan with approximately 1 billion cubic meters of natural gas per year. Gas supplies from Egypt were halted in 2013 due to insurgent activities in the Sinai and domestic gas shortages in Egypt. In light of this, a liquified natural gas terminal was built in the Port of Aqaba to facilitate gas imports. In 2017, a low-capacity gas pipeline from Israel was completed which supplies the Arab Potash factories near the Dead Sea. As of 2018, a large capacity pipeline from Israel is under construction in northern Jordan which is expected to begin operating by 2020 and will supply the kingdom with 3 BCM of gas per year, thereby satisfying most of Jordan's natural gas consumption needs.

The state-owned National Electric Power Company (NEPCO) produces most of Jordan's electricity (94%). Since mid-2000, privatization efforts have been undertaken to increase independent power generation facilities; a Belgian firm was set to begin operations at a new power plant near Amman with an estimated capacity of 450 megawatts. Power plants at Az Zarqa (400 megawatts) and Al Aqabah (650 MW) are Jordan's other primary electricity providers. As a whole, the country consumed nearly 8 billion kilowatt-hours of electricity in 2003 while producing only 7.5 billion kWh of electricity. Electricity production in 2004 rose to 8.7 billion kWh, but production must continue to increase in order to meet demand, which the government estimates would continue to grow by about 5% per year. About 99% of the population is reported to have access to electricity.

=== Transport ===
The transportation sector on average contributes some 10% to Jordan's GDP, with transportation and communications accounting for $2.14bn in 2007. Well aware of the sector's importance to the country's service and industry-oriented economy, in 2008 the government formulated a new national transport strategy with the aim to improve, modernise and further privatise the sector. With no imminent solution to the ongoing security crisis in Iraq in sight, prospects for the Jordanian transport sector as a whole look bright. The country will arguably remain one of the major transit points for both goods and people destined for Iraq, while the number of tourists visiting Jordan is set to continue to increase. The main events to follow in the near future are the relocation of Aqaba's main port, a national railway system, and the construction of a new terminal at QAIA. Volatility in fuel prices is almost certainly going to have negative effects on operational costs and as such may hamper the sector's average annual growth of around 6%. However, uncertain fuel prices also offer a great deal of incentive to boost private investments in alternative modes of transport such as public buses and improved trains.

On late June 2025 it was reported about Jordan's Transport Minister inspection of new bus routes from Irbid and Jerash to Amman. the trial was held with GPS and scheduled stops. Full service will start in July and August, with routes to Salt and Karak coming later. This is part of a five-year plan to improve public transport across the country.

=== Water supply and sanitation ===
Water supply and sanitation in Jordan is characterized by severe water scarcity, which has been exacerbated by an increase in population due to many factors. These include natural population expansion over time as muslim families are often large, regional wars including the Israel War of Independence in 1948, The Six Day War, the Gulf War of 1990, the Iraq War of 2003 and the Syrian Civil War of 2011. Jordan is considered one of the ten most water scarce countries in the world. High population growth, the depletion of groundwater reserves and the impacts of climate change are likely to aggravate the situation in the future.

The country's major surface water resources, the Jordan River and the Yarmouk River, are shared with Israel and Syria. The Disi Water Conveyance Project from the non-renewable Disi aquifer to the Jordanian capital of Amman, opened in July 2013, increases available resources by about 12%. Jordan and Israel signed a peace agreement in 1994. The peace agreement, in Annex II, includes Israel providing 50 million cubic meters of water per year to Jordan. Israel voluntarily doubled that amount to 100 million cubic meters per year. Israel incurs high costs to do this as most of the additional water is produced through desalination of ocean water from the Mediterranian Sea and Red Sea. A plan to bridge the remaining gap between demand and supply through increased use of reclaimed water and desalinated sea water to be provided through the Red Sea-Dead Sea canal was abandoned by Jordan in 2001.

Despite Jordan's severe water scarcity, more than 97% of Jordanians have access to an improved water source and 93% have access to improved sanitation. This is one of the highest rates in the Middle East and North Africa. In Jordan, it is common to store water in rooftop tanks. The level of water lost through leakage, underregistration, and theft in municipal water supply (non-revenue water) is approximately 51%. Water tariffs are subsidized. A National Water Strategy, adopted in 2009, emphasizes desalination and wastewater reuse. The country receives substantial foreign aid for investments in the water sector, accounting for about 30% of water investment financing.

=== Services ===
Services accounted for more than 70% of gross domestic product (GDP) in 2004. The sector employed nearly 75% of the labor force in 2002.

==== Banking and finance ====
Jordan's banking system consists of 25 commercial banks, three Islamic banks, and nine foreign banks, with total assets of Jordanian dinar, JOD 57 billion (or EUR69.6 billion). Between 2010 and 2020, the sector's total assets climbed by 5% on average, led by a 7% increase in lending.

The banking sector is widely regarded as advanced in both regional and international terms. In 2007, total profits of the 15 listed banks rose 14.89% to JD640m ($909m). Jordan's strong growth of 6% in 2007 was reflected in a 20.57% expansion in net credit to JD17.9bn ($25.4bn) by the end of the year. The most improvement was in trade, construction and industry. Many banks suffered from the sharp correction in the Amman Stock Market in 2006, encouraging them to focus on core banking business in 2007, and this was reflected in a 16.65% rise in net interest and commission income to JD1.32bn ($1.87bn). The stock market also picked up in 2007 and total portfolio income losses decreased. Although Jordan's banking sector is small by global standards, it has attracted strong interest from regional investors in Lebanon and the GCC. New regulations introduced by the CBJ, in addition to political stability, have helped to create a favourable investment environment. Its conservative policies helped Jordan avoid the 2008 financial crisis, Jordanian banks was one of the only countries that posted a profit in 2009.

Banking sector profitability was momentarily impacted (in 2020) by the COVID-19-induced economic downturn, but it already recovered to pre-COVID-19 levels in 2021. The Jordanian banking sector's non-performing loan (NPL) ratio remained at 5.5% during the COVID-19 pandemic. According to a survey conducted in 2021, the pandemic's impact on credit supply in Jordan has been quite limited, with two-thirds of the banks surveyed indicating a constant or growing availability of loans. 50% of banks also reported an increase to loan supply for SMEs. For corporates, the increase was 25%.

90% of Banks believed that the pandemic will also affect the digitization of internal processes. 81% believed that banks' daily operations will be impacted and 90% believed that banks' online offerings will be improved.

Jordan's insurance market, with 29 companies operating in a country of just 5.7 million people, is saturated, despite regulatory encouragements for mergers and acquisitions. In terms of market share based on premiums, motor coverage accounts for 42.4%, medical insurance 18.6%, fire and property damage 17%, life 9.8%, marine and transport 7.9% and other insurance the remaining 4.3%. The insurance sector made up 2.52% of GDP in 2006, up from 2.43% in 2005. Current plans call for increasing the sector's GDP contribution to 7% in the short term and 10% in the long term. The sector holds great potential but remains underdeveloped. Region-wide price increases and a lack of consumer understanding of products are two major challenges. In addition, cultural considerations, including religion, make improving market penetration difficult. The cost of living has also risen, and the IMF forecasts that the inflation rate would reach 9% in 2008. Salaries have remained unchanged, however, leaving consumers with less disposable income. Other than mandatory motor coverage, insurance products are considered a luxury by average Jordanians, who must often prioritise spending. There would likely only be a few changes to the market in the coming year. Members of the sector would like to see greater coordination among the regulators and those working for the kingdom's legal system in order to improve insurance laws.

==== Education ====
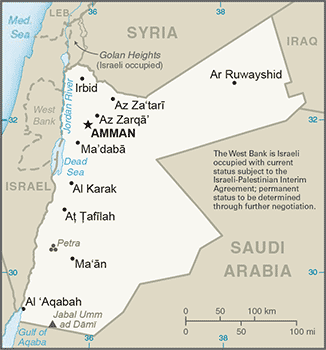
Map of Jordan

The education system of the Hashemite Kingdom of Jordan includes basic, secondary, and higher education and has dramatically evolved since the establishment of the state in the early 1900s. The role played by a good education system has been significant in the development of Jordan from a predominantly agrarian to an industrialized nation over time.

Jordan has the highest number of researchers in research and development per million people among all the 57 countries that are members of the Organisation of Islamic Cooperation (OIC); in Jordan there are 8,060 researchers per million people, while the world average is 2,532 per million.

In 2003, the share of budget dedicated to education was 6.4 percent of total government expenditure; education spending as a percentage of GDP was 13.5 percent in the same year. At 8.9 percent, Jordan has the lowest illiteracy rate in the Arab world (as of 2012). The primary gross enrollment ratio has increased from 71 percent in 1994 to 98.2 percent in 2006. The transition rate to secondary school, during the same period, increased from 63 percent to 97 percent and transition rates to higher education have varied between 79 and 85 percent of secondary school graduates. Along with these high enrollment and transition rates, Jordan has achieved a 97.89% gender parity in literacy by 2012, and full parity in primary and secondary enrollment by 2008.

Jordan is ranked 95 out of 187 in the Human Development Index. Despite strained resources, the Ministry of Education of Jordan has developed highly advanced national curriculum, and many other nations in the region have developed their education system using Jordan as a model. Jordan ranks number seven in the Arab World in education based on the global knowledge index.

The Ministry of Education (MoE) is responsible for the pre-primary, primary, and secondary levels of education. Post-secondary education is the responsibility of the Ministry of Higher Education and Scientific Research (MoHESR), which includes the Higher Education Council and the Accreditation Council.

The Human Rights Measurement Initiative (HRMI) finds that Jordan is fulfilling only 63.7% of what it should be fulfilling for the right to education based on the country's level of income. HRMI breaks down the right to education by looking at the rights to both primary education and secondary education. While taking into consideration Jordan's income level, the nation is achieving only 62.1% of what should be possible based on its resources (income) for primary education and 65.2% for secondary education.

==== Healthcare ====
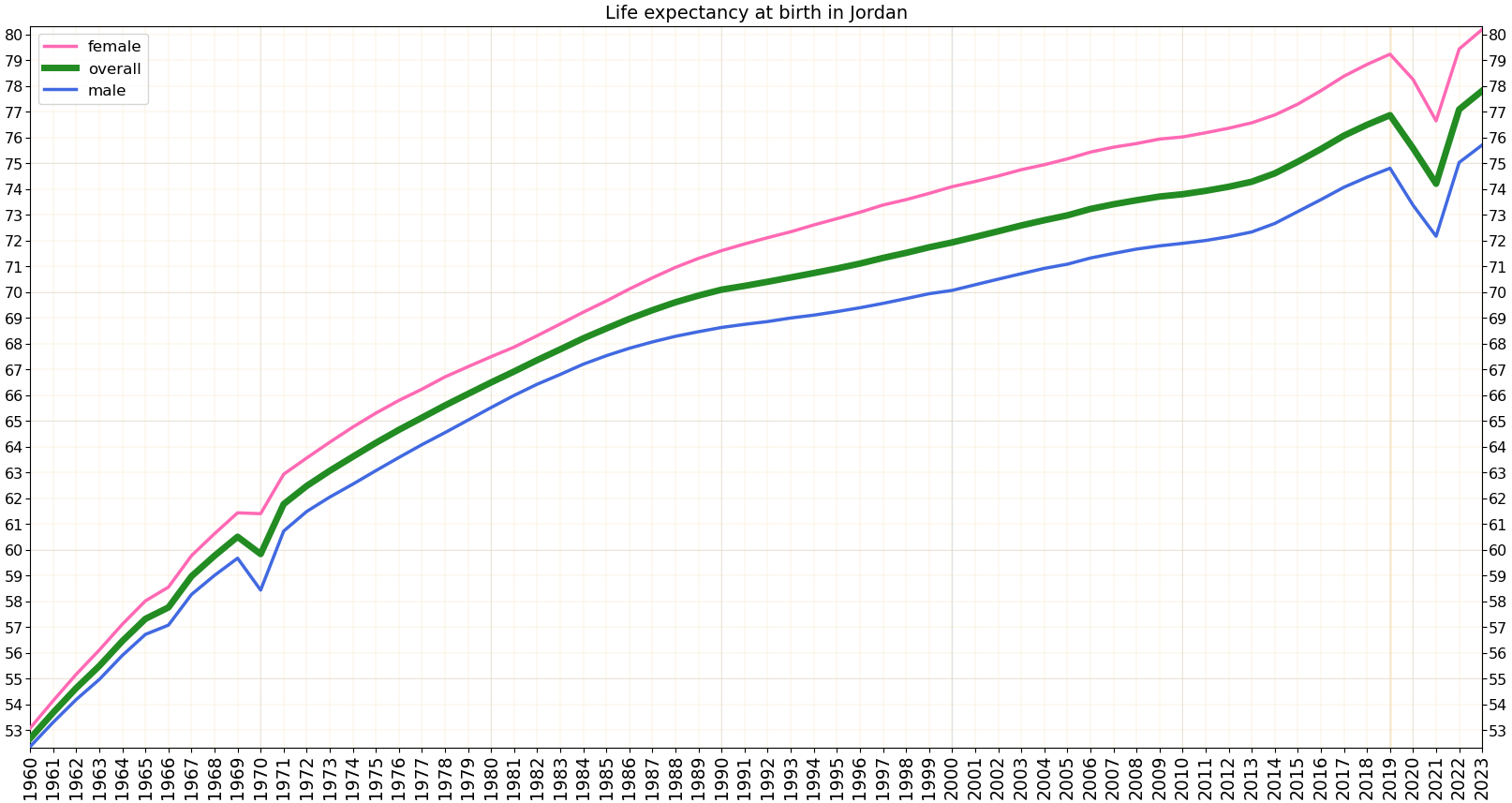
Life expectancy in Jordan

Life expectancy in Jordan was 74 years in 2021. 99% of Jordan's population have access to clean water and sanitation despite it being one of the world's poorest in water resources. There were 203 physicians per 100,000 people in the years 2000–2004, a proportion comparable to many developed countries and higher than most of the developing world.

According to 2003 estimates, the rate of prevalence of human immunodeficiency virus/acquired immune deficiency syndrome (HIV/AIDS) was less than 0.1 percent. According to a United Nations Development Program report, Jordan has been considered malaria-free since 2001; cases of tuberculosis declined by half during the 1990s, but tuberculosis remains an issue and an area needing improvement. Jordan experienced a brief outbreak of bird flu in March 2006. Noncommunicable diseases such as cancer also are a major health issue in Jordan. Childhood immunization rates have increased steadily over the past 15 years; by 2002 immunizations and vaccines reached more than 95 percent of children under five.

The Human Rights Measurement Initiative finds that Jordan is fulfilling 79.5% of what it should be fulfilling for the right to health based on its level of income. When looking at the right to health with respect to children, Jordan achieves 97.2% of what is expected based on its current income. In regards to the right to health amongst the adult population, the country achieves 94.0% of what is expected based on the nation's level of income. Jordan falls into the "bad" category when evaluating the right to reproductive health because the nation is fulfilling only 47.3% of what the nation is expected to achieve based on the resources (income) it has available.

==== Real estate ====
Despite recording a relative slowdown compared to the expansion of recent years, Jordan's real estate market continued to grow in 2007. Trading totaled JD5.6bn ($8bn), up from JD5.2bn ($7.4bn) in 2006, according to Jordan's Land and Survey Department. Although the years of astounding growth—some 75% in 2004 and 48% in 2005—seem to have passed, the future looks bright for real estate, as demand continues to outstrip supply, while Jordan remains an investment destination for foreign businesses, second-home buyers and Jordanians working abroad. With Jordan's continuing sharp population growth, as well as its strategic location at the heart of the Middle East, the kingdom's main market drivers indicate a bright future for years to come. Although a number of class-A office space developments are currently under construction, it would take a few years to close the gap between demand and supply.

==== Telecommunications and IT ====
Telecommunications is a billion-dollar industry with estimates showing that core markets of fixed-line, mobile and data service generate annual revenue of around JD836.5m ($1.18bn) per year, which is equivalent to 13.5% of GDP. Jordan's IT sector is the most developed and competitive in the region due to the 2001 telecom liberalization. Market share of the mobile sector, the most competitive telecoms market, is currently fairly evenly divided between the three operators, with Zain, owned by MTC Kuwait, maintaining the largest share (39%), followed by France Telecom's brand Orange (36%) and Umniah (25%), which is 96% owned by Bahrain's Batelco. End of year figures for 2007 show that the market trend is towards greater parity, with Zain's share falling in the space of a year from 47% in 2006 and the other two operators picking up subscribers. The increased competition has led to pricing that is more favourable to consumers. Mobile penetration is currently around 80%.

Ambitious subsequent national strategies were formulated already since Y 2000 as a private sector initiative directly led by his majesty the king of Jordan. Information technology association in Jordan (int@j) was established to kick off a private sector process that would focus on preparing Jordan for the new economy through IT and shall reflect the national objectives towards automation and modernization in co-operation with the ministry of information technology in Jordan the (MOICT). The latest strategy will take the sector through to 2011, aims to bring Jordan to precise objectives. The ICT sector currently accounts for over a 14% (indirect) of the kingdom's GDP. This figure includes foreign investment and total domestic revenue from the sector. Employment growth in the sector was progressive and reached up to 60.000 (indirect) by 2008. The government is working to address employment issues and education related to sector by developing ICT training and opportunities to increase the overall penetration of ICT in Jordanian society. The policy outlines a number of objectives for the country to reach within the next three years, including almost doubling the size of the sector to $3bn, and pushing internet user penetration up to 50%.

The early founder of Int@j and its first chairman of the board is Karim Kawar and early activists who drove the national strategic objectives and helped formulate an action plan through the developing pillars were Marwan Juma Jordan's minister of ICT, Doha Abdelkhaleq on labour and education. Humam Mufti on advocacy and Nashat Masri on Capital and finance amongst others. Such an infrastructure made Jordan a suitable location for IT startups that operate in the fields of web development, mobile application development, online services, and investment in IT businesses.

The IT industry in Jordan in the year 2000 and beyond got a very big boost after the Gulf War of 1991. This boost came from a large influx of immigrants from the Gulf countries to Jordan, mostly from Jordanian expatriates from Kuwait, totaling few hundred thousands. This large wave impacted Jordan in many ways, and one of them was on its IT industry.

==== Media and advertising ====
Although the state remains a major influence, Jordan's media sector has seen significant privatisation and liberalisation efforts in recent years. Based on official rack rates, research firm Ipsos estimated that the advertisement sector spent some $280m towards publicity in Jordan's media, 80% of which was spent on newspapers, followed by TV, radio and magazines. The biggest event of 2007 was the cancelled launch of ATV, the kingdom's first private broadcaster. As a result, the state-owned Jordan TV (JTV) remains the country's sole broadcaster. In recent years, Jordan has also seen a spectacular rise in the number of blogs, websites and news portals as sources of news information. The increasing diversification of Jordan's media is a good sign and should boost advertising revenues and private initiatives.

Recording growth of 30%, 2007 turned out to be yet another outstanding year for Jordan's advertising industry. Following nearly a decade of double-digit growth, however, most publicity specialists expect to see a relative slowdown in 2008. Unlike 2007, no major campaigns were planned for the first part of 2008. Additionally, the Jordanian advertising had some catching up to do with the rest of the region in terms of average expenditure per capita. As the sector matures, it is only normal for growth figures to gradually decrease. Since 2000 total ad spend increased from $77m to $280m in 2007, an increase of 260%. The Jordanian telecoms sector was the biggest ad spender in 2007, accounting for around 20% of the market, followed by the banking and finance sector (12%), services industry (11%), real estate (8%) and the automotive sector (5%). In the next year, particularly if there is a downturn, it would become increasingly important for the sector to develop good vocational training and to begin to take advantage of new media markets.

==== Tourism ====
The state of the tourism sector is widely regarded as below potential, especially given the country's rich history, ancient ruins, Mediterranean climate, and diverse geography. Despite personal appeals by the king and an increasingly sophisticated marketing campaign, the industry is still adversely affected by the political instability of the region. More than 5 million visitors entered Jordan in 2004, generating US$1.3 billion in earnings. Earnings from tourism rose to US$1.4 billion in 2005. The fact that the bulk of Jordan's tourist trade emanates from elsewhere in the Middle East should contribute to the industry's growth potential in the years ahead, as Jordan is relatively stable, open, and safe in comparison to many of its neighbors. The tourism sector remains an important element of the Jordanian economy, directly employing some 30,000 Jordanians and contributing 10% to the kingdom's GDP. Despite a decline in Arab and Gulf visitors, 2007 marked a year of steady growth for the tourism sector. Revenues jumped 13% to nearly $2.11bn during the first 11 months, up from $1.86bn for the same period in 2006. The sector is overseen by the government's National Tourism Strategy (NTS), which was established in 2004 to take the industry through 2010. NTS aimed to double tourism revenues during the period and to increase tourism-related jobs to 91,719. The first goal has already been met but the second one might be more of a challenge: between 2004 and 2007 the total number of people employed in the sector rose from 23,544 to 35,484. This is impressive growth, but less than half the 90,000-or-more goal. NTS hopes to place Jordan as a boutique destination for high-end tourists. The strategy identifies seven priorities or niche markets: cultural heritage (archaeology); religion; ecotourism; health and wellness; adventure; meetings, incentives, conventions and exhibitions (MICE); and cruises. The Jordan Tourism Board's (JTB) marketing budget has increased in the past year from JD6m ($8.52m) to JD11.5m ($16.3m). These are positive times for tourism in Jordan, with steady growth and major projects in the pipeline. The sector has to make improvements in infrastructure and marketing, but overall the industry has been improving for the past several years.

Jordan's real GDP fell by 1.6% in 2020, with a dramatic reduction in tourism—a crucial economic sector—being one of the primary transmission routes of the crisis. Tourism provides for about 40% of Jordan's export receipts and 10–15% of GDP, with 3.8 million international tourists every year. The sector's GDP share fell to 3% in 2020, and the recovery from the COVID-19 pandemic is likely to be slow.

== External trade ==
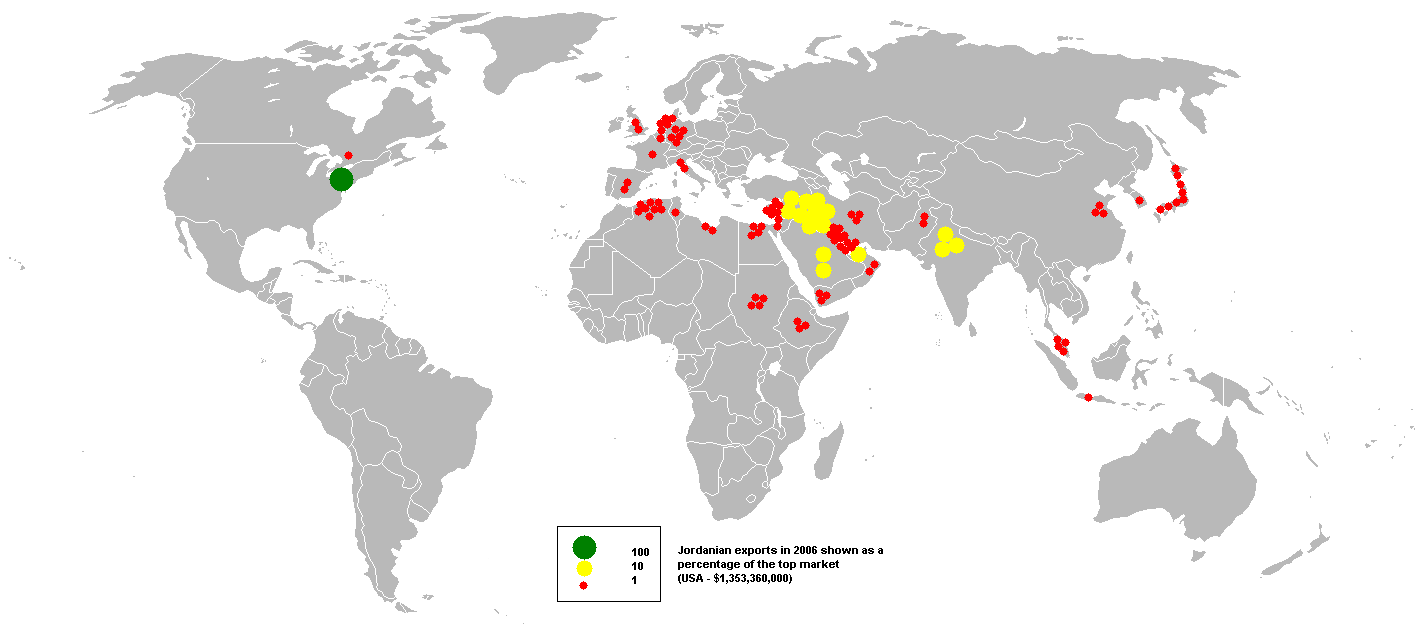
Jordanian exports in 2006

Exports of Jordan by product category (2019) Chemical products Transportation Machines Mineral products Plastics and rubbers Metals Foodstuffs Precious metals Textiles Instruments Animal products Vegetable products Paper goods Footwear and headwear Miscellaneous Stone and glass Wood products Animal and vegetable bi-products Animal hides Arts and antiques Weapons

Since 1995, economic growth has been low. Real GDP has grown at only about 1.5% annually, while the official unemployment has hovered at 14% (unofficial estimates are double this number). The budget deficit and public debt have remained high and continue to widen, yet during this period inflation has remained low due mainly to stable monetary policy and the continued peg to the United States Dollar. Exports of manufactured goods have risen at an annual rate of 9%. Monetary stability has been reinforced, even when tensions were renewed in the region during 1998, and during the illness and ultimate death of King Hussein in 1999.

Expectations of increased trade and tourism as a consequence of Jordan's peace treaty with Israel have been disappointing. Security-related restrictions to trade with the West Bank and the Gaza Strip have led to a substantial decline in Jordan's exports there. Following his ascension, King Abdullah improved relations with Arabic states of the Persian Gulf and Syria, but this brought few real economic benefits. Most recently the Jordanians have focused on WTO membership and a Free Trade Agreement with the U.S. as means to encourage export-led growth.

== Investment ==
The stock market capitalisation of listed companies in Jordan was valued at $37.639 billion in 2005 by the World Bank.

== Salaries and welfare ==
According to the 2015 Middle East and North Africa Salary Survey conducted by Bayt.com, Respondents from GCC (49%) seem somewhat happier with the raise they received in 2014, as compared to respondents from Levant (42%):

The Social Security Corporation (SSC) is the primary government agency in Jordan responsible for administering social insurance, covering a large percentage of the formal labor force by providing pensions, disability and survivor benefits, work injury coverage, unemployment support, and maternity leave.

== Aqaba Special Economic Zone ==
The population of Aqaba is only 100,000 people and is set to double over the next 10 years. The town benefits from some natural advantages. Located at the southern tip of the country, between Saudi Arabia and Israel on the shores of the Red Sea, the city is close to the Suez Canal, with easy access to key trade centres in both the Middle East and Africa. Aqaba is also the kingdom's only deep-water port town, taking up most of Jordan's scant 27 km (17 mi) of coastline. The Aqaba Special Economic Zone (ASEZ) has been responsible for most of this development since it opened in 2001.

It covers 375 km^{2} and offers tax and tariff incentives, as well as full repatriation rights and more flexible operating regulations. There is a 5% flat tax on most economic activities, no tariffs on imported goods, no currency restrictions and no property taxes for corporate land. Additionally – and somewhat controversially, given Jordan's past issues with unemployment – companies based in ASEZ are allowed to employ up to 70% foreign workers in their operations. Jordan's investment profile has been growing nationally, but according to the Jordan Investment Board (JIB), the ASEZ has exceeded investment targets by 33%. By 2006 it had already brought in around $8bn in investment, some $2bn more than the original target of $6bn by 2020. ASEZ expects to attract a further $12bn spread across a number of sectors, including tourism, finance and industry. The Development Law of 2008 set in place a universal framework for special development areas based on the Aqaba model.

== See also ==
- List of companies of Jordan
- List of largest companies in Jordan by revenue
- Central Bank of Jordan
- Corruption in Jordan
- General Federation of Jordanian Trade Unions
- Jordan Investment Board
- MENA ICT Forum
- Ministry of Finance (Jordan)
- Hafiz Program (Jordan)
- Jordan Media City
- New Abdali
- Science and technology in Jordan
- Economy of Palestine
- Economy of the Middle East
