= Dave Levitan =

American science journalist

- Education: Haverford College, New York University
- Writing career
- Genre: non-fiction
- Website: www.davelevitan.com

Dave Levitan is an American science journalist. His work has appeared in Wired, Atlantic, Scientific American, the Guardian, the Washington Post, and Time. He is author of the book Not a Scientist: How Politicians Mistake, Misrepresent, and Utterly Mangle Science.

== Life ==
Levitan graduated with a degree in journalism from Haverford College in 2003. He attained his MA Journalism from NYU's Science, Health and Environmental Reporting Program (class of 2008–2009). He has been an active contributor to the "William E Burrows Science, Health and Environmental Reporting Scholarship Fund" at NYU since 2012.

Levitan worked as a freelance science writer with FactCheck.org in 2015, and was hired to track the errors made by politicians discussing science.

Since 2009 he has been active on Twitter as @davelevitan, where he describes himself as a "Journalist, mostly science and politics". He is married and lives with his wife, Jamie, in Baltimore.

== Work ==
Levitan has written for more than 50 mainstream press outlets and medical trade publications and has had his work republished by USA Today and Huffington Post, among others. His work in journalism has been both prolific and far-ranging within the intersections of science, health, the environment and politics. In 2010 he wrote an article for Technology Review on sustainable energy and smart grids. In 2018 he wrote an article for Cancer Network entitled "Can Surgery Type Predict Opioid Abuse in SCLC?"

In 2012, he wrote a piece discussing the Red Sea–Dead Sea water conveyance system, a plan to pipe water from the Red Sea to the dead sea in an effort to save the Dead Sea. This approach was opposed by conservationists. In the same year he wrote an article for Gizmodo entitled: "After extensive mathematical modeling, scientist declares "Earth is F**ked""

In 2013, he wrote an article for Scientific American on the stagnation in primary scientific funding within the NIH. This had led to severe financial crises within organisations such as the Marine Biological Laboratory, Massachusetts, where Levitan had spent time as a teenager involved in research on squid.

Several of his articles focused on the governmental position of science advisor to the president of the United States. In 2017, he wrote an article for "The Atlantic" in which he presented the origin and history of the position of science adviser, dating back to President Truman. In late 2016 he interviewed John Holdren for Wired. Holdren had served as senior science and technology advisor to President Barack Obama. The interview touched on the attitudes towards science held by several presidents, including George W. Bush, Bill Clinton and Donald Trump.. He also wrote an article for Time on President Donald Trump's "anti-science attitude" and reiterated the argument in an opinion piece for the Guardian. His article for the Washington Post in March 2017 further highlighted the Trump administration's views on science and science literacy.

=== Published books ===
The lessons learned during his time working at FactCheck.org led Levitan to write a book in which he outlined 12 common tactics that politicians employ to "butcher science", including “the Butter-up,” “the Undercut,” and “the Oversimplification.”

- Levitan, D. (2017). Not a Scientist: How Politicians Mistake, Misrepresent, and Utterly Mangle Science. W. W. Norton. ISBN 978-0-393-35333-4.
