= MDSC =

MDSC may refer to:

- Mediterranean–Dead Sea Canal
- Myeloid-derived suppressor cell, immunosuppressive cells from the myeloid lineage
- MDSc, a dental degree
