= List of power companies of Turkey =

This is a list of electric power companies in Turkey.

== Turkish power companies ==
- Akenerji Elektrik Üretim A.S., Gümüssuyu, Istanbul
- Aksa Energy, Günesli, Istanbul
- Alarko Energy Group, Istanbul
- As Makinsan Makina Insaat San Müh Ltd Sti, Çankaya, Ankara
- Ayen Enerji A.S., Ankara
- Barmek Holding, Maltepe, Ankara
- Baymina Enerji, Polatli, Ankara
- Bereket Enerji, Gürcan, Denizli
- Bilgin Enerji, Ankara
- Bis Enerji Elektrik Üretim A.S.
- Borusan EnBW Enerji Yatırımları ve Üretim A.S., Istanbul
- Çalik Enerji A.S., Sögütözü, Ankara
- Ciner Group, Üsküdar Istanbul
- Desa Enerji Elektrik Üretimi Otoprodüktör Grubu A.S., Pinarbasi, İzmir
- Ekinciler Holding A.S., Maslak, Istanbul
- Electricity Generation Company (state owned EÜAS), Bahçelievler, Ankara
- ENDA Enerji Holding AS, Alsancak, İzmir
- Enerjisa, Alikahya, İzmit
- Enkapower (Enka Insaat ve Sanayi A.S.), Beşiktaş, Istanbul
- Entropy Enerji, Yesilköy, Istanbul
- ERIH Energy Holding, Beşiktaş, Istanbul
- Ersin Enerji, Kadıköy, Istanbul
- Gama Energy Inc., Kavaklidere, Ankara
- Genel Enerji, Kavaklidere, Ankara
- Güngör Elektrik, Bahçelievler, Ankara
- Hamitabat Elektrik Üretim Ve Ticaret A.S. (HEAS), Lüleburgaz, Kirklareli
- Isın Elektromekanik Tesisler, Ankara
- Iskenderun Enerji Üretim Ve Ticaret A.S., Ankara
- Içtas Enerji, Kavaklidere, Ankara
- Karadeniz Energy Group, Kagithane, Istanbul
- Nurol Energy Production and Marketing Inc., Kavaklidere, Ankara
- Ova Elektrik A.S., Karaköy, Istanbul
- Petkim
- Proterm Enerji, Balgat, Ankara
- Proterm Enerji, Balgat, Ankara
- Reswell Energy Generation Company, Yenimahalle, Ankara
- Turkish Electric Power (TEP), Kazan, Ankara
- Vam Mühendislik, Yenişehir, Diyarbakır, Diyarbakır
- Yeniköy Elektrik Üretim Ve Tic A.S. (YEAS), Muğla
- Zorlu Enerji, Avcilar, Istanbul
- Joule Enerji, Osmangazi, Bursa

== See also ==
- Energy law
