= List of largest companies in Jordan by revenue =

The following table shows the top 50 Jordanian companies by revenue (USD) for 2025, with their stock tickers and recent price change percentages. Jordan's economy is anchored by banking, energy, insurance, and mining sectors.

== Top revenue companies in Jordan (2025) ==
Rank	Company	Ticker	Revenue (USD)	Price	Change (%)	Source
1	Arab Bank Group	ASE-ARBK	3.04 B	8.74	3.69%	
2	Jordan Petroleum Refinery Co. Ltd.	ASE-JOPT	2.10 B	8.25	1.21%	
3	Jordan Phosphate Mines	ASE-JOPH	1.78 B	30.48	0.79%	
4	Jordan Electric Power Company	ASE-JOEP	1.54 B	4.05	0.70%	
5	Afaq For Energy Co. P.L.C	ASE-MANE	1.42 B	2.77	0.00%	
6	Arab Potash Company	ASE-APOT	927.57 M	48.16	0.74%	
7	The Housing Bank for Trade and Finance	ASE-THBK	609.45 M	5.65	1.27%	
8	Capital Bank of Jordan	ASE-CAPL	538.06 M	3.67	3.59%	
9	International General Insurance Holdings Ltd.	IGIC	535.11 M	22.71	1.93%	
10	Jordan Telecommunications Company	ASE-JTEL	505.99 M	4.29	1.33%	
11	Jordan Kuwait Bank	ASE-JOKB	461.48 M	4.19	0.00%	
12	Irbid District Electricity Co. Ltd.	ASE-IREL	438.57 M	7.98	–0.53%	
13	Bank al Etihad	ASE-UBSI	337.46 M	3.06	6.90%	
14	Jordan Islamic Bank	ASE-JOIB	297.80 M	6.07	0.94%	
15	Bank of Jordan	ASE-BOJX	226.99 M	3.60	4.51%	
16	Cairo Amman Bank	ASE-CABK	200.88 M	1.84	0.00%	
17	Jordan Ahli Bank	ASE-AHLI	154.97 M	1.68	–0.83%	
18	Jordanian Duty Free Shops	ASE-JDFS	121.43 M	9.28	1.86%	
19	Dar Al Dawa Development and Investment Co. Ltd.	ASE-DADI	116.81 M	1.61	–1.72%	
20	Gulf Insurance Group - Jordan	ASE-GIGJ	116.37 M	4.22	–4.78%	
21	Safwa Islamic Bank	ASE-SIBK	115.17 M	3.93	5.30%	
22	Invest Bank	ASE-INVB	113.83 M	2.54	3.45%	
23	United Cable Industries Company PLC	ASE-UCIC	110.82 M	1.34	0.00%	
24	Arab Jordan Investment Bank	ASE-AJIB	93.87 M	1.99	1.44%	
25	Ready Mix Concrete and Construction Supplies	ASE-RMCC	83.28 M	1.50	0.00%	
26	Jordan Poultry Processing & Marketing Co. PLC	ASE-JPPC	81.60 M	0.325	0.00%	
27	Zara Investment Holding Company	ASE-ZARA	74.22 M	0.65	2.22%	
28	Jordan Commercial Bank	ASE-JCBK	69.19 M	1.54	0.93%	
29	First Insurance Company	ASE-FINS	67.73 M	1.12	–1.25%	
30	Zarka Educational & Investment Co.	ASE-ZEIC	61.94 M	4.65	0.61%	
31	Jordan French Insurance Co. (P.L.C.)	ASE-JOFR	57.30 M	0.946	1.52%	
32	Offtec Holding Group Company (P.L.C.)	ASE-OFTC	53.51 M	1.74	–0.81%	
33	The Arab Pesticides & Veterinary Drugs Mfg. Co.	ASE-MBED	53.31 M	4.15	2.80%	
34	Arab Banking Corporation (Jordan)	ASE-ABCO	53.07 M	1.05	0.00%	
35	Injaz for Development and Projects Company P.L.C	ASE-ATCO	51.62 M	0.325	0.00%	
36	Arabia Insurance Company - Jordan	ASE-AICJ	50.91 M	1.55	0.00%	
37	The Islamic Insurance Company	ASE-TIIC	49.10 M	2.66	0.00%	
38	Al-Nisr Al-Arabi Insurance Company	ASE-AAIN	48.51 M	5.59	7.32%	
39	Middle East Insurance Co.	ASE-MEIN	48.15 M	1.62	4.55%	
40	Arab International Company for Education and Investment	ASE-AIEI	47.88 M	3.64	–3.73%	
41	Masafat for Specialised Transport Company	ASE-MSFT	44.62 M	1.10	–2.50%	
42	Industrial Commercial & Agricultural Public Limited Company	ASE-ICAG	43.98 M	1.23	0.00%	
43	Jerusalem Insurance Co. (L.T.D)	ASE-JERY	39.95 M	2.13	0.00%	
44	Jordan Dairy Company Ltd.	ASE-JODA	39.91 M	3.08	4.81%	
45	Petra Education Company PLC	ASE-PEDC	36.68 M	5.30	0.00%	
46	Arab Jordanian Insurance Group	ASE-ARGR	35.07 M	0.918	–4.41%	
47	Al-Faris National Company for Investment & Export P.L.C.	ASE-CEBC	34.77 M	0.692	2.08%	
48	The Consulting & Investment Co. Group Ltd.	ASE-CICO	33.84 M	2.47	0.00%	
49	Jordan Express Tourist Transport Co. Ltd	ASE-JETT	33.33 M	2.33	0.00%	
50	Future Arab Investment Company	ASE-FUTR	33.00 M	0.989	2.94%	

== See also ==
- Economy of Jordan
- List of companies of Jordan
- Amman Stock Exchange
