= MENA ICT Forum =

MENA ICT Forum is a biennial Middle East and North Africa (MENA) regional information and communication technology (ICT) industry event, held in Jordan under patronage of King Abdullah II.

== Format ==
The current format is an expansion from the former Jordan ICT Forum held in 2002, 2004, and 2006.

== Mission ==
MENA ICT Forum was established to showcase the MENA region's ICT activities, focusing on industry trends, opportunities, and future outlook.

== Past Speakers ==
In prior years, keynote speakers have included:

- King Abdullah II of Jordan
- Intel CEO Craig Barrett
- Cisco chairman John Chambers
- 3Com CEO Edgar Masri
- Sun Microsystems chief researcher John Gage

== See also ==
- IT Leader Forum
