= Disi aquifer =

The Disi aquifer is a vital fossil groundwater aquifer stretching from the southern edge of the Dead Sea in Jordan to Tabuk in northwestern Saudi Arabia. In Saudi Arabia it is known by the name Al Sag. The aquifer that is mostly under Saudi territory with a portion of it beneath Jordan, covers an area of approximately 320 kilometers in length and 500 meters in depth. The water is dated to the Pleistocene age (around 30,000 years ago) and is considered non-renewable, due to its minimal recharge rate of about 50 million cubic meters (MCM) per year, which is significantly less than the combined extraction rates of both countries.

== Geography and geology ==
The Disi Aquifer spans approximately 320 kilometers in length and reaches depths of up to 500 meters. It extends from northern Saudi Arabia into southern Jordan and is geologically part of the Saq Sandstone Formation, which dates back to the Pleistocene age. The aquifer is classified as non-renewable, or "fossil," meaning it was recharged thousands of years ago during wetter climatic periods and receives minimal modern recharge—estimated at just 50 million cubic meters (MCM) annually.

== Water use and extraction ==
The aquifer primarily lies beneath Saudi territory but extends into southern Jordan. This enables both countries use of the water.

=== Jordan ===
Jordan, which is known for its water shortage, launched the Disi Water Conveyance Project, that was completed in 2013. Its goal is to transport water from the aquifer to Amman and other northern cities. The project consists of a 325-kilometer pipeline capable of delivering 100 MCM annually. Funded at a cost of approximately US$1.1 billion, the project was financed through a public-private partnership that included international loans and grants.

Concerns were raised over natural radioactivity in Disi water, particularly radon levels. Jordanian authorities mitigated this by blending Disi water with other sources to meet international drinking water standards.

=== Saudi Arabia ===
In Saudi Arabia, the aquifer—referred to locally as the Saq Aquifer—is primarily used for agricultural irrigation, particularly in desert farming projects. Withdrawals from the Saudi side are estimated to be significantly higher than in Jordan, reaching up to 1 billion cubic meters per year, raising concerns about over-extraction and the long-term sustainability of the resource.

== Environmental and political issues ==
On April 30, 2015, the two countries signed the Agreement for the Management and Utilization of the Ground Waters in the Al-Sag/Al-Disi Layer, which governs the shared use of the aquifer—known as the Disi Aquifer in Jordan and the Saq Aquifer in Saudi Arabia. The agreement states: Establishing a 10-kilometer buffer zone on each side of the border where groundwater extraction is prohibited. Preventing pollution and ensuring the protection of water quality. Creating a Joint Technical Committee to oversee implementation, monitor water levels and quality, and coordinate data sharing.

== See also ==
- Red Sea–Dead Sea Water Conveyance
- Water scarcity in Jordan
- Groundwater depletion
