= Hafiz Program =

The Hafiz Program (Arabic: برنامج حافز) is an initiative of the Jordanian government aimed to help its young population to find jobs and support digital development in both public and private sectors. This is part of a larger governmental plan to modernize the economy and reduce youth unemployment. Even though the name "Hafiz" has a religious connotation, there is no religious context.

== Background ==
Rising unemployment, the need for a digitally skilled labor force brought the government to develop an economic modernization vision that include the Hafiz program. the main emphasis is on skilled human capital to face the digital and economic needs. Jordan plans for the program to be a practical mechanism to support its broader vision, by reducing unemployment and encouraging employment in digital and administrative roles. At the same time is will give public institutions and private enterprises an opportunity to affordably hire and train young workers.

== Objectives ==
The program's objectives are to help young jobseekers find jobs, encourage digital progress in government services and consolidate the private sector's ability to hire more workers in areas like IT, online services, and administration. By doing this, it will help support Jordan’s national development goals and grow a skilled, professional tech employees.

== Program structure ==
The program was built in such a manor that offers financial benefits to employers who take part in it and hire eligible young employees. The government pays half of the salary up to 200 JOD per month, while the employers enjoy reduced social security fees. The program is suitable for young adults, unemployed and mainly recent graduates helping them enter the job market and gain experience in digital and service related fields.

== Implementation and outcomes ==
According to reports as of mid-2024, the Hafiz Program helped about 4,205 people get jobs in the public sector and 6,470 more in the private sector. Most of these jobs supported efforts to improve digital services in government and to help small and medium businesses grow. People wjo took part in the program usually found jobs in areas like tech support, digital record keeping, IT services, and office coordination. The program is seen as an important move to connect job training with Jordan’s long-term economic goals.

== Fiscal actions ==
The Jordanian government passed a new rule on July 2024 to help companies existing social security costs from the Hafiz Program. Companies have now five years to pay their debt, making it easier for them to join the progream. This comes to show that the government is trying to help businesses while keeping the program fair and balanced.

== Public reaction ==
Public reaction to the program was a positive one as both employers and jobseekers felt benefitted by it. Companies paid lower hiring costs and had access to qualified jobseekers, while young professionals gain valuable work experience and income.Some people have raised concerns about workers not being kept after the support ends and delays in paperwork, but these issues are small compared to the program’s overall success. In general, the Hafiz Program is seen as a good example of how the government and businesses can work together to improve jobs and support the digital economy.

== See also ==
- Economy of Jordan
