= IT Leader Forum =

- Status: Active
- Location: Moscow
- Country: Russia
- Inaugurated: 2004

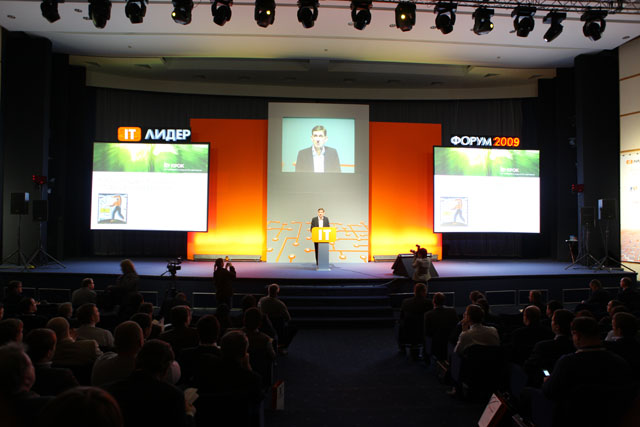
IT Leader Forum 2009, Moscow

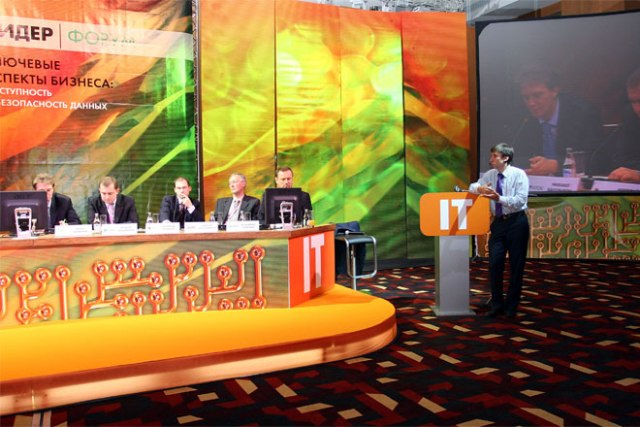
IT Leader Forum 2006, Moscow

The IT Leader Forum is held annually in Moscow, Russia. It brings together 200-300 Russian and international CIOs, analysts, and business strategists to discuss IT issues and share expertise regarding the implementation of IT solutions and highlights the best ways to address business issues using IT. Participants of the IT Leader Forum have an opportunity to exchange opinions with representatives of global leading IT vendors, discuss business approaches with industry peers, and establish new business contacts. Both Russian and international IT experts participate actively in the IT Leader Forum.

The IT Leader Forum is organized as part of the annual IT Leader project, a series of events devoted to organizations and CIOs who have directly contributed to the promotion of innovative information technology which increases business performance and spurs development within Russia.

== The IT Leader Forum 2014 ==
The 12th IT Leader Forum was held on October 14, 2015, in the Digital October Center (Moscow), with a key topic titled 'Modeling the Future.'. The IT Leader Forum included a general plenary session followed by a case study session with a focus on Big Data and Building Information Modeling technology. See details on the official webpage.

The special guest of the forum was Josep Curto, CEO at Delfos Research and professor at IE Business School Madrid, which is ranked by the Financial Times, Wall Street Journal, and Forbes as being among the top three business schools in Europe. Josep told attendees how a proper combination of Big Data, information models, and technology can provide a competitive edge in an ever-changing world.

== International Speakers ==
In 2014, Kjell Nordström and Jonas Ridderstråle, professors at the Stockholm School of Economics and authors of the bestsellers Funky Business and Re-energizing the Corporation. told the Forum audience about changes that executives and IT professionals can make in the current economic environment in order to address market restriction challenges.

In 2013, Steve Wozniak, Apple co-founder and a legendary computer designer and engineer, had a Q&A session with the forum host — Mikhail Berger, Director General of RUMEDIA Group (BFM Portal, Business FM Radio), and discussed the ways of driving creativity and fostering entrepreneurial spirit in corporate culture and IT environment.

In 2012, the forum started with a presentation by Thomas Frey, the founder and senior futurist at the DaVinci Institute (US), who talked about how today's fantasies could become reality in the next decades and the new environment that businesses will have to adapt to.

In 2011, Dean Nelson, Senior Director, Global Foundation Services - eBay Technical Operations, addressed attendees via a video interview, and Matt Wood, Technology Evangelist for Amazon Web Services, joined the panel via video conferencing.

In 2010, the Plenary Session included presentations by Peter Hinssen (Managing Partner, Across Technology), Howard Polinski (Partner, Head of Performance and Technology Department, KPMG in Russia and the CIS), and Ed Toben (IT Advisor, Colgate-Palmolive).

In 2009, among key speakers at the IT Leader Forum were: Roger McLoughlin (Continuity & Risk Authority, Vodafone), Ronald Loos (Director of Technology and Operations, Grubb & Ellis Management Services), Max Corney (Communications Consultant, West Midlands Police, UK), Graeme K. Hackland (Head of Information Systems, Renault F1 Team), Jim Tomaney (Senior Programme Manager, Barclays Bank), James Michael Ansley (EMEA Vice President and General Manager, 3Com Corporation).

In the preceding years, presentations were given by Diego Lo Giudice (Principal Analyst) and Dr. Alexander Peters (CIO Group Principal Analyst) from Forrester Research, Robert Farish (Vice President and Regional Managing Director in Russia and the CIS, IDC), Eija Holmstrom (Director and Managing Partner, Gartner Consulting), Theo Zuijdwijk (Area Head of Business Services), Susan Johnson (IT Global Service Delivery Manager, Standard Bank Corporate Investment Banking), and Waldemar Klemm (Senior Manager IT, Toyota Motorsport).

== History ==
- 2013 - The 10th annual IT Leader Forum was held on October 10, 2013, in Moscow at Digital October Center, with the key topic being IT as a Source of Inspiration during Economic Uncertainty.
- 2012 - The IT Leader Forum was held on October 9, 2012, at Moscow International Performing Arts Centre, with the key topic being announced as "Global Industry Leaders' Vision of the Future" and discussed in a talk show format with two opposing sides.
- 2011 - The 2011 IT Leader Forum was held on October 5, 2011 at the Digital October Center (Moscow, Russia). Key theme of the 8th IT Leader Forum was ‘Finding Hidden Opportunities for Business Growth and Retaining Efficiency Gains’. The IT Leader Forum was held in a talk show format based on three discussion sessions.
- 2010 - The IT Leader Forum ‘Competitive Breakthrough in the Post-Crisis Period: Ideas for Leaders’ was held in Moscow. The forum consisted of a Plenary Session followed by Breakout Sessions (Executive Workshops).
- 2009 — IT Leader Forum “Innovations During a Period of Cost-Cutting” was held in Moscow and included a Plenary Session and three Breakout Sessions with Russian and international experts and professionals in IT and enterprise-level management. Breakout Sessions were devoted to personal data protection, business continuity, and innovations implementation during the financial downturn.
- 2008 — IT Leader Forum “IT as a Tool to Increase Business Efficiency in Key Segments of the Economy” was held in Moscow. After a Plenary Session, attendees discussed topical business issues in new conditions at round tables for the manufacturing, banking and finance, oil and gas, transportation and logistics, retail, and energy industries.
- 2007 — IT Leader Forum “Information Technology as Business Process Reengineering Tool” was held in an open discussion format in Moscow.
- 2006 — IT Leader Forum “Key Business Aspects: Data Security and Availability” was held in a TV talk show format in Moscow.
- 2005 — IT Leader Forum “Minimizing IT Solutions Implementation Risks in Modern Organizations” was held in Moscow and included a Plenary Session and Panel Discussions.
- 2004 — the first IT Leader Forum “Information Technology as a Leverage to Achieve Strategic Business Goals” was held in Moscow and featured a Plenary Session and Open Discussions.
