= GAMA Enerji =

Turkish company

- Native name: GAMA Enerji A.Ş.
- Industry: Energy
- Founded: 2002
- Headquarters: Ankara, Turkey
- Revenue: ▲$858 million (2022)
- Website: Official website

GAMA Enerji A.Ş. is a Turkish company founded in 2002 that engages in building, financing and investing in energy and water utility infrastructure. While project development, construction and operation of power plants are its main focuses, power generation and trading are also a part of its activities.

The total power generation capacity of the GAMA Enerji is 1,715.80 MW including two CCGT power plants in Galway, Ireland and Kirikkale, Turkey. GAMA Enerji also owns Disi Mudawara, the Amman water conveyance project by the Ministry of Water of Jordan. Despite the headquarters is located in Ankara, the company is active in energy trading business with its affiliate GATES Enerji established in Istanbul.

General Electric Energy Financial Services (GE EFS) acquired 50% of the shares of GAMA Enerji in 2007 and held its position as a shareholder until 2015. In 2015 International Finance Corporation (IFC), a member of the World Bank Group, and a fund managed by IFC acquired 27% of shares of the company. In late 2015, Malaysia's state electricity utility, Tenaga Nasional (TNB) has bought a 30 percent stake in GAMA Enerji.
