= Disi Water Conveyance =

Jordanian water supply project

Water will be pumped from the Disi aquifer to Amman, Jordan.

The Disi Water Conveyance Project is a water supply project in Jordan. It is designed to pump 100,000,000 cubic metres (2.2×10^{10} imp gal) of water per year from the Disi aquifer, which lies beneath the desert in southern Jordan and northwestern Saudi Arabia. The water is piped to the capital, Amman, and other cities to meet increased demand. Construction began in 2009 and was mostly completed in July 2013 when the project was inaugurated by King Abdullah of Jordan. Its total cost was US$1.1 billion.

An independent study revealed the water to be radioactive and potentially dangerous to drink, initially surrounding the project with controversy. Jordan's Ministry of Water and Irrigation has stated that the radioactivity is not a problem because the water is to be diluted with an equal amount of water from other sources, although it remains disputed if this would be enough to bring the water up to standards. The Ministry said the independent study was inaccurate, as it did not test water from any of the wells that will be used in the project. The President of the Jordanian Geologists Association Bahjat Al Adwan stated that the radiation is present in the water in the form of radon, and thus dissipates harmlessly when the water is exposed to air on the surface.

== Background ==
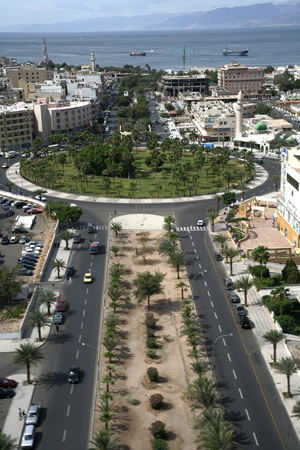
The Disi aquifer currently supplies Aqaba with 15 million cubic meters of water per year.

The water in the Disi aquifer gathered 30,000 years ago during the Pleistocene era. It is 320 kilometres (200 mi) long and located 500 metres (1,600 ft) below ground inside of porous sandstone. The aquifer is classified as a fossil aquifer, meaning that the water is not replenished if it is removed. In fact, the aquifer has a recharge rate of 50,000,000 m^{3} (1.1×10^{10} imp gal) of water per year. This recharge is dwarfed, however, by the current extraction rate of 90,000,000 m^{3} (2.0×10^{10} imp gal) for agricultural and domestic needs, including 15,000,000 m^{3} (3.3×10^{9} imp gal) of water that is supplied to Aqaba, Jordan. The current extraction rate of 90,000,000 m^{3} (2.0×10^{10} imp gal), coupled with the future extraction rate of 100,000,000 m^{3} (2.2×10^{10} imp gal) for the project, is expected to produce a total extraction rate of 190,000,000 m^{3} (4.2×10^{10} imp gal). At that rate, the water in the aquifer will last a minimum of 50 years, according to the Disi Water Company.

Only a small portion of the Disi aquifer lies beneath Jordan, while the majority lies beneath Saudi Arabia. Saudi Arabia also extracts water from the aquifer (called the Saq aquifer in Saudi Arabia). The aquifer has created controversy between Saudi Arabia and Jordan, with each country demanding the other to use less of the shared water. There is no formal agreement between the countries regarding the water and the Disi Water Conveyance Project is being constructed without Saudi consultation or involvement.

Non-revenue water is a serious problem in Amman. Currently, 40% of water in Amman is lost as non-revenue water. The city rations water, with individual residents averaging 36 hours of water access weekly. If the non-revenue water problem remains, it is possible that a large portion of the water provided by the Disi Water Conveyance project will also be lost as it is piped through Amman.

The Disi Water Conveyance project was first proposed in the 1990s, but was initially regarded as too expensive. A feasibility study was completed in 1996. But it was not until 2007 that the Jordanian Government was able to contract a firm to begin construction.

== Design ==
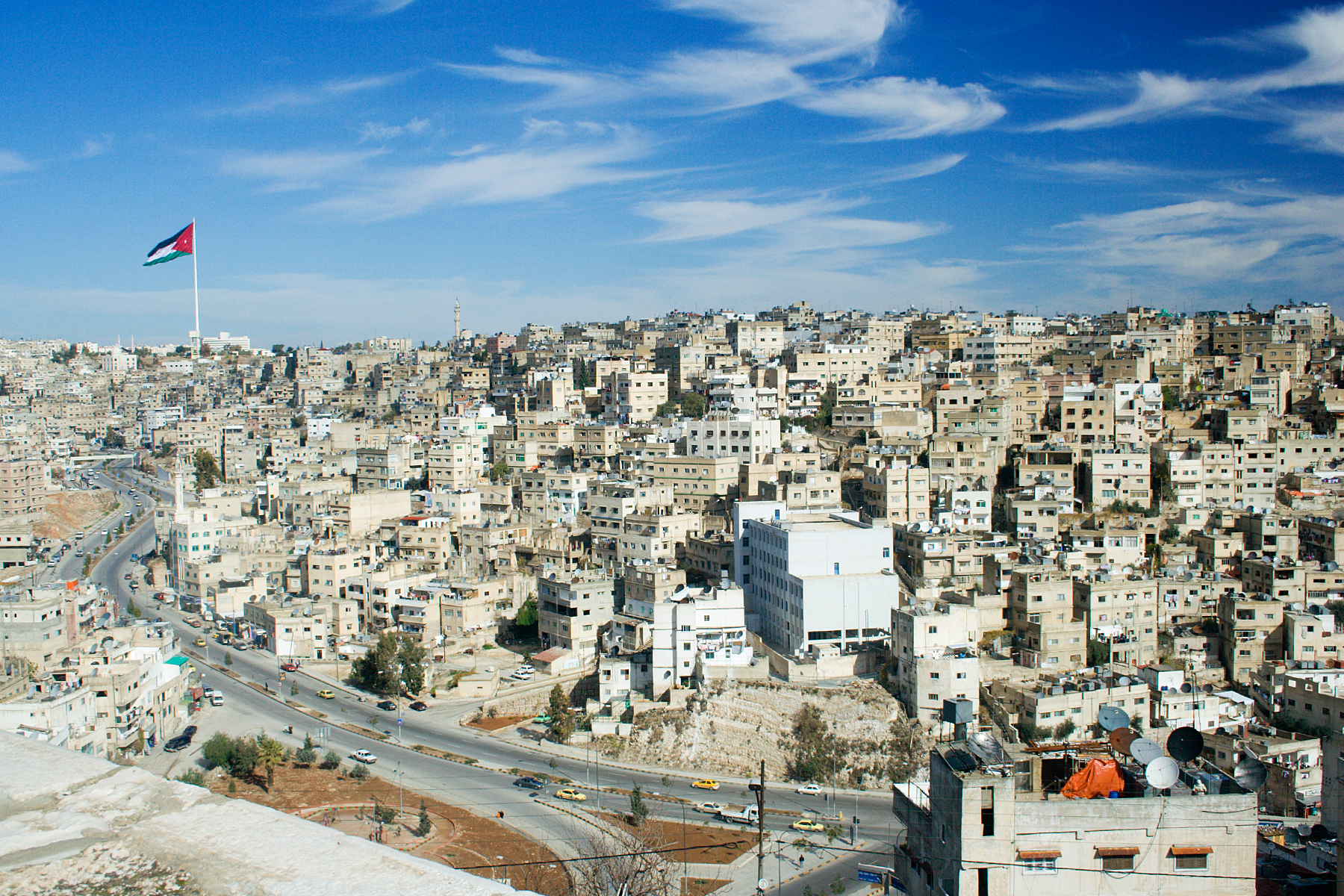
The water will be used to meet growing demand from Jordan's capital, Amman.

The project proposed by the Jordanian government will pump 100,000,000 m^{3} (2.2×10^{10} imp gal) of water per year from 55 wells in the aquifer. However, a total of 64 wells will be drilled, the extra wells to be used as piezometers to measure the elevation of the water. Nine of the 55 water producing wells will be used in emergencies only. The wells producing water will be drilled 600–700 m (2,000–2,300 ft) deep while the piezometers will be drilled to a depth of 400 m (1,300 ft). The plan is to pump the piezometer wells for 25 years, according to the project leader.

After being pumped from the wells, water will then be transported to Amman, via a 325 km (202 mi) pipeline, passing through a pumping station, then flowing by gravity and being pumped up again. The reservoirs near Amman are only 200 m (660 ft) higher than the surface area where the pumping field is located. Nevertheless, the total elevation differential over which water needs to be lifted by both pumping stations is about 800 metres (2,600 ft). To pump the water through the proposed pipeline will require 4 kilowatt-hours per cubic meter of water. The entire project would require approximately 4 percent of Jordan's current electrical production. The project is expected to be completed by January 2017 and to run for 25 years or until the Two Seas Canal is built.

The 100,000,000 m^{3} (2.2×10^{10} imp gal) of water will be divided between the Abu Alanda reservoir and the Dabouq reservoir. Approximately 40,000,000 m^{3} (8.8×10^{9} imp gal) of water will be sent to the Abu Alanda reservoir where it will be diluted with water from the Zara Ma’en desalination plant as well as water from Wala. The remaining 60,000,000 m^{3} (1.3×10^{10} imp gal) of water will be sent to the Dabouq reservoir where it will be diluted with water from the Zai Treatment Plant as well as water from Wala. It is estimated that the cost of one cubic meter of water from the project will be 0.74 JOD (US$1.05).

== Construction ==
In June 2009, the Turkish firm GAMA began construction. By February 2011, eight piezometer wells and two water producing wells have been completed. Twenty-three other wells were to be drilled, and 85 km (53 mi) of pipe were to be installed. By April 2011, 99% of the 340 km (210 mi) of project's piping had arrived from Turkey, an anonymous source told The Jordan Times. This source stated that the project was over 50% completed and that it was ahead of schedule.

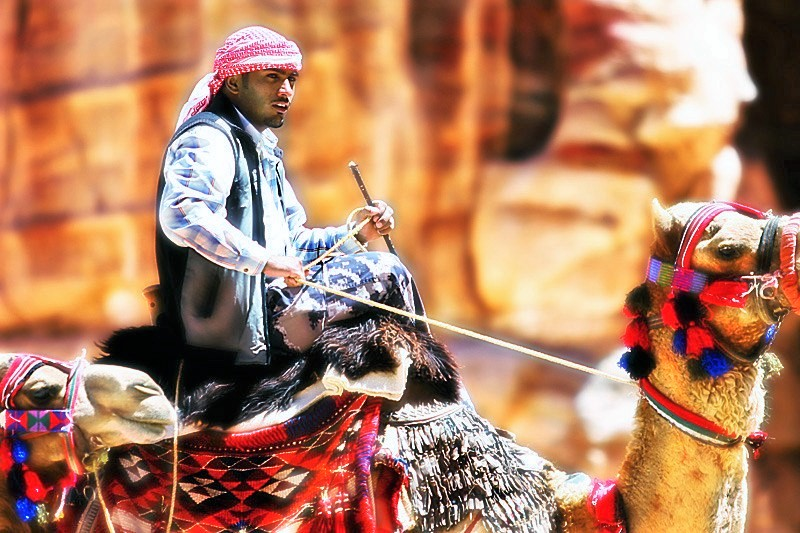
A traditional Bedouin man in Southern Jordan

Construction was delayed by disgruntled members of a Bedouin tribe living in the area, who allegedly intimidated workers by shooting in the air and at construction equipment. All work was stopped for two weeks after two employees were killed in January 2011 — allegedly murdered by a member of the Bedouin tribe. The tribe had been upset because GAMA did not rent its water tankers, according to Adnan Zu'b, Assistant Secretary Genera at the Ministry of Water and Irrigation. To satisfy the tribe, GAMA then announced plans to rent tankers from the tribe. However, near the site of the killings, the town of Ma'an had protests against the government's failure to punish the killers. During October and November, 2011 the construction works have been suspended at southern part of the project from Hasa to Mudawwara due to security problems created by tribes, therefore there is delay in this part which will affect the completion date of the project.

By the end of 2013, portion of the production wells were substantially complete and turned over to DIWACO.

== Structure and funding ==
The project is funded on a build-operate-transfer concession contract between the Jordanian government and the Disi Water Company (Diwaco), a subsidiary of the Turkish construction company GAMA Energy. GAMA Energy is a joint venture between the Turkish GAMA Holding and the US firm General Electric Energy Financial Services. Diwaco is responsible to build the project over a 4-year period and to operate it for another 25 years. At the end of the concession period the ownership will transfer to the Jordanian government. Diwaco will retain any profits and will bear the risk of losing its equity. Construction is undertaken by GAMA Power Systems, another subsidiary of GAMA Holding, under a turnkey engineering, procurement and construction contract with Diwaco. Operation will be undertaken by Disi Amman Operation Maintenance LLC, a fully owned subsidiary of the French water company Suez Environnement, under a separate operating contract with Diwaco.

The project is funded through an equity contribution of about US$200M from Diwaco, a $300M grant and a $100M stand-by facility from the Jordanian government, as well as US$475M in foreign loans to Diwaco. The project's total cost is expected to be US$1.1 billion. The U.S. Overseas Private Investment Corporation has lent US$250M to Diwaco to support U.S. foreign investment on the basis that General Electric partially owns GAMA Energy. The state-owned French bank PROPARCO, which is the part of the French Development Agency (AFD) that supports private sector development, and the European Investment Bank (EIB) each lent about US$100M to Diwaco. The loan package has been put together by the Bank ABC. Much of the government grant supporting the project comes from sovereign soft loans that the government of Jordan has borrowed from the EIB and AFD and passes on as a grant to the project. AFD provided US$50M for the state grant and $48M for the stand-by facility.

== Radioactivity concerns ==
The project became controversial in 2009 when a study performed by Avner Vengosh of Duke University revealed the Disi water to be highly radioactive. Water was tested from 37 existing wells in the aquifer, and all but one had concentrations of radioactive radium-226 and radium-228 isotopes that exceeded international standards for drinking water. Some of the water tested exceeded standards by 2,000%. Drinking water with these isotopes has been linked to bone cancer and leukemia. Though expensive, the water could be purified of the radioactive isotopes through ion-exchange purification.

Jordan's Ministry of Water and Irrigation has stated that the radioactivity is not a problem because the water is to be diluted with an equal amount of water from other sources. This dilution would presumably halve the radioactivity of the water which, according to Vengosh's data, would not be enough to bring the water up to standards. The Ministry of Water and Irrigation, however, has declared Vengosh's data to be inaccurate, as his study did not test water from any of the wells that will be used in the project. As radiation varies from well to well, it is possible that the data Vengosh collected does not accurately reflect the water sources to be used in the project.

Although testing at the well sites that supply Aqaba reveals high radioactivity, testing performed using water from the tap in Aqaba shows the water to be safe. There is no confirmed explanation for this phenomenon, although it is hypothesized that the depth of the wells (the ones that supply Aqaba are relatively shallow) may play a role as the radiation varies greatly at shallow depths. In May, 2011, the President of the Jordanian Geologists Association Bahjat Al Adwan stated that the radiation is present in the water in the form of Radon, and thus dissipates harmlessly when the water is exposed to air on the surface. This explanation has not been confirmed scientifically, however.

During the inauguration of the conveyor in July 2013 Minister of Water and Irrigation Hazim El-Nasser said that after mixing Disi water radiation is less than 0.5 millisievert per year. The worldwide average natural dose of human's exposure to radiation is about 2.5-3 millisievert per year. "Disi water is purer than bottled water and I take full responsibility for what I’m saying," the Minister said during a press conference.

== See also ==
- Red Sea–Dead Sea Water Conveyance
- Aqaba–Amman Water Desalination and Conveyance Project
