= Mediterranean–Dead Sea Canal =

Proposed canal

The Mediterranean–Dead Sea Canal (MDSC) is a proposed project to dig a canal from the Mediterranean Sea to the Dead Sea, taking advantage of the 400 m (1,300 ft) difference in water level between the seas. The project could correct the drop in the level of the Dead Sea observed in recent years. The canal could also be used to generate hydroelectric power because of surface difference and maybe by salinity gradient power, and desalinate water by reverse osmosis.

== History ==
The idea was first proposed by William Allen in 1855 in a work called "The Dead Sea – A new route to India". At that time it was not yet known that the Dead Sea lies below sea level, and Allen proposed this canal as an alternative to the Suez Canal. Later, many engineers and politicians picked up on the idea, including Theodor Herzl in his 1902 novel Altneuland. Most of the early proposals used the East bank of the Jordan River, but a modified form, using the West bank, was proposed after the separation of Transjordan from the Palestine Mandate. The idea was discussed at some length by Willy Ley in Engineers' Dreams, but it was then politically impractical; even the route west of Jordan would have to cross the 1949 armistice line twice.

A 1975 detailed project study utilizing the difference in water levels between the Mediterranean sea and the Dead Sea for power generation was the subject of a first publication by the engineers Wendt and Kelm in the German trade journal Wasserwirtschaft.

For this proposal, water from the Mediterranean sea is led through a pressure duct starting at the Israeli town of Ashdod and flowing into a storage pool situated directly at the steep descent to the Dead Sea from where it will drop almost 400 m (1,300 ft) through a pressure shaft to drive three Francis turbines with an output of 100 MWe each. The sketch of the projected system illustrates the continuous supply of water from the Mediterranean sea (west to east) by a 7 km (4.3 mi) long free-surface flow channel, a 65 km (40 mi) long pressure tunnel and a 3 km (1.9 mi) long storage pool. This underground power station design is the world's first planned high-pressure seawater power station.

The approximately 8 m (26 ft) diameter pressure tunnel is designed for a maximum flow rate of 2.5 m/s (8.2 ft/s) deducting pressure losses and allowing a given slope of the tunnel in direction to the Dead Sea. By means of this shaft the Mediterranean sea and the storage pool behave according to the principle of communicating vessels. Hence the storage pool automatically supplies potential energy to comply fully with the widest range of potential requirements.

Due to the climatic conditions between 60 and 70 m^{3} (2,100 and 2,500 cu ft) water evaporate from the Dead Sea per second. At present these quantities are not replaced by natural influent resulting in a steady drop of the Dead Sea's level while increasing concentration of dissolved salts. If only the evaporation losses are replaced by water from the Mediterranean sea the power station will have an average output of 160 MWe. A total of 300 MWe is available at short time for peak loads. The underground power station is designed to allow a wide variety of requirements. Before being fed into the turbines, the artificially stored water from the Mediterranean can be used as cooling water for a thermal power station with an output of approx. 1000 MWe. The waste heat, in turn, can be used for desalting the seawater. The resulting fresh water can be used to irrigate the arid areas around the Dead Sea.

The idea was revived during the 1980s for the purpose of power generation following the 1973 oil crisis. The Mediterranean–Dead Sea Company studied various alternatives and recommended a route from the Gaza Strip to Masada. However, the project did not commence due to economic and financial doubts. The idea was brought up again during the 1990s. In addition to the Gaza Strip–Masada route, two other alternatives were considered, namely a Red Sea–Dead Sea Water Conveyance and a northern route from the Mediterranean to the Bet She'an Valley. As of 2009, the Red Sea–Dead Sea Water Conveyance was a joint Jordanian, Israeli and Palestinian project. In 2011, the World Bank released a study with recommendations for moving forward.
