= Corruption in Jordan =

Corruption in Jordan is a social and economic issue. A 2026 study found that anti-corruption efforts in Jordan primarily target petty corruption by low-level bureaucrats rather than grand corruption by powerful regime elites.

== Overview ==
Transparency International's 2025 Corruption Perceptions Index, which scored 182 countries on a scale from 0 ("highly corrupt") to 100 ("very clean"), gave Jordan a score of 50. When ranked by score, Jordan ranked 56th among the 182 countries in the Index, where the country ranked first is perceived to have the most honest public sector. Compared to regional scores, the best score among Middle Eastern and North African countries (Note: Algeria, Bahrain, Egypt, Iran, Iraq, Israel, Jordan, Kuwait, Lebanon, Libya, Morocco, Oman, Qatar, Saudi Arabia, Syria, Tunisia, United Arab Emirates, and Yemen) was 69, the average was 39 and the worst was 13. For comparison with worldwide scores, the best score was 89 (ranked 1), the average was 42, and the worst was 9 (ranked 181 in a two-way tie).

== Dynamics ==
Societal interests in Jordan are generally not channelled through political parties, but through informal networks. Favouritism, cronyism, nepotism and bribery, as is the use of influence or personal and business connections to gain favours, such as jobs or access to goods and services, are covered by a particular phenomenon known as wasta, the middleman.

There have been corruption cases involving high-level business and political officials with connections to the royal family.

== See also ==
- International Anti-Corruption Academy
- Group of States Against Corruption
- International Anti-Corruption Day
- ISO 37001 Anti-bribery management systems
- United Nations Convention against Corruption
- OECD Anti-Bribery Convention
- Transparency International
