= Red Sea–Dead Sea Water Conveyance =

Planned water pipeline in Jordan

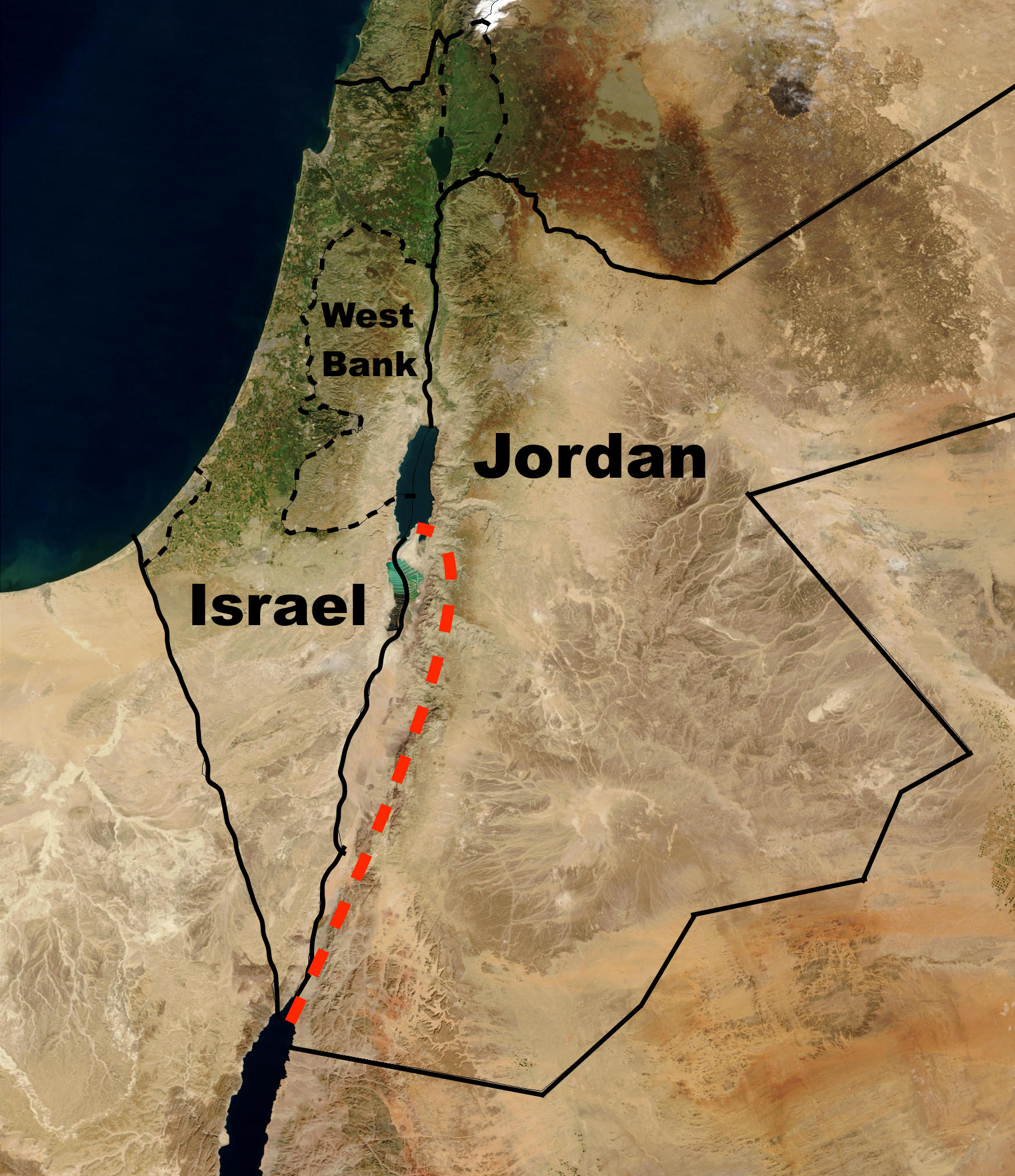
The planned Red Sea–Dead Sea Canal, shown in red, would have lain entirely in Jordan and would have been implemented by Jordan.

The Red Sea–Dead Sea Conveyance (RSDSC), sometimes called the Two Seas Canal, was a planned pipeline to run from the coastal city of Aqaba by the Red Sea to the Lisan area in the Dead Sea. Its abandonment was reported in June 2021.

It was to provide potable water to Jordan and Israel, bringing water with a high concentration of salts resulting from the desalination process (reject brine) to stabilise the Dead Sea water level, and generate electricity to support the energy needs of the project. The project was planned to be carried out by Jordan and is entirely in Jordanian territory. It was to be financed by the governments of Jordan, Israel, and a number of international donors. The project had a tentative $10 billion price tag, with the first phase—slated to begin construction in 2021—costing $1.1 billion.

The water level in the Dead Sea is shrinking at a rate of more than one metre per year, and its surface area has shrunk by about 33% since the 1960s. This is largely due to the diversion of most of the flow into the Dead Sea from the Jordan River, much of which originates in the Sea of Galilee. The completion of the National Water Carrier scheme in 1964 diverted water for Israel, Jordan and Syria to use for irrigation and drinking water.

The decline of the Dead Sea level is causing major local environmental problems, including sinkholes and receding shorelines. Other routes for a conduit for the same objectives as the RSDSC, including the Mediterranean–Dead Sea Canal, were proposed in Israel in the 1980s, but were discarded.

== History ==
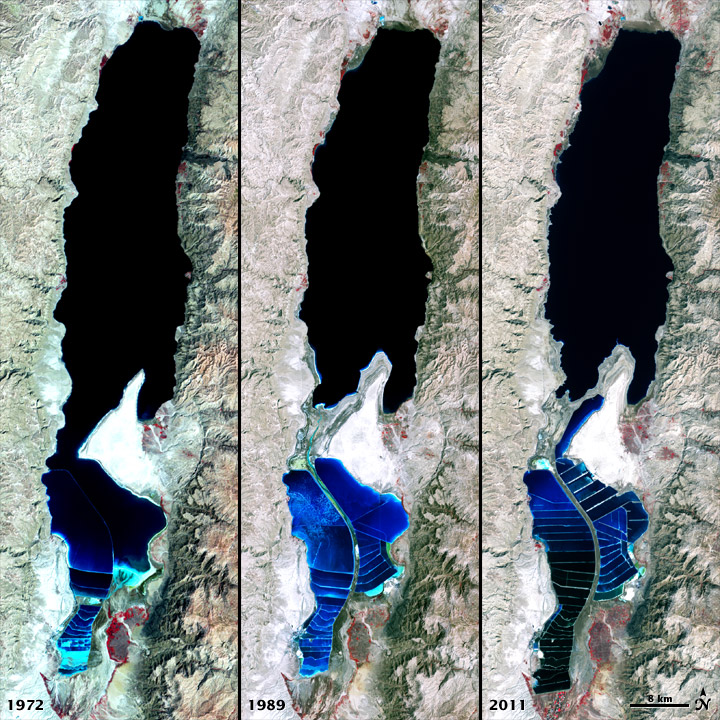
This series of Landsat photos shows the shrinking shoreline of the Dead Sea, with the southern basin being replaced by evaporation ponds.

The connection of the seas by canal was first suggested in the mid-19th century by British officers who were looking for ways to circumvent the French-built Suez Canal and had not realized that the level of the Dead Sea is much lower. Later on, at the end of the 19th century, planners thought of ways to use water from the Jordan River, which originates in the Sea of Galilee, for irrigation and to bring sea water to the Dead Sea to create energy from its position of −390 m below sea level. One of those planners was the Zionist leader Theodor Herzl.

The completion of the National Water Carrier scheme in 1964 diverted water for Israel, Jordan and Syria to use for irrigation and drinking water.

The Red Sea–Dead Sea conduit (RSDSC) was proposed at the end of the 1960s and was analysed as part of the peace process between Israel and Jordan. In the late 1990s a team headed by Refael (Rafi) Benvenisti working with Minister Shimon Peres as the Minister of Regional Cooperation suggested to establish the stabilization of the Dead Sea water level ('Saving the Dead Sea') as a major objective of the project. It suggested building the project in stages to test the mixing of the two seas water phasing the big investment associated with the project. The project was called "the Peace conduit" and was proposed to be located on Jordanian territory for financial and implementation reasons.

On 9 May 2005, Jordan, Israel and the Palestinian Authority signed an agreement to go ahead with a feasibility study for the RSDSC. The agreement was signed on the Dead Sea by Jordanian Water Minister Raed Abu Soud, Israeli Infrastructure Minister Binyamin Ben-Eliezer and Palestinian Planning Minister Ghassan al-Khatib.

In June 2009, after a meeting with World Bank President Robert Zoellick, the Israeli Regional Cooperation Minister, Silvan Shalom, announced a pilot project to build a "pilot" pipe 180 km long from the Red Sea to the Dead Sea. The pipe would pump 200 million cubic metres per year. Half of this would be desalinated for Jordanian consumption and half put into the Dead Sea.

In October 2009 the Jordanian government announced that it would unilaterally tender a Jordan Red Sea Project. According to the government, this project could be considered as the first phase of the RSDSC project. The Jordan project was to be implemented by a private company under authority granted by the government. The project would also serve as an economic development project to create housing for 1.36 million people (1) south of Amman, (2) at the Southern end of the Dead Sea, (3) north of Aqaba and (4) in gated communities. Several tourist resorts would be created. It was divided into five phases. The first phase would include extraction of 400 million cubic metres of seawater per year, resulting in 210 million cubic metres/year (MCM/yr) of freshwater and 190 million cubic metres/year for discharge into the Dead Sea. The construction of the first phase was expected to take seven years. In March 2011, the Ministry of Water and Irrigation short-listed six firms for the first phase of the project.

The World Bank announced that it would release a feasibility study of water conveyance from the Red Sea to the Dead Sea together with an environmental and social assessment as well as a study of alternatives in early 2012. The many alternatives studied included a restoration of the Jordan River to its natural flow and the taking of no action.

In August 2013, Jordanian government announced that it would move ahead with the first phase of a project. On 9 December 2013, an agreement to build the pipeline was signed by Israel, Jordan, and Palestine. On 21 June 2016, Jordan announced that it had received 17 bids from international firms to construct the canal.

On 27 November 2016, it was announced that the Jordanian government was shortlisting five consortia to implement the project. Jordan's ministry of Water and Irrigation said that the $100 million first phase of the project would begin construction in the first quarter of 2018, and would be completed by 2021.

In June 2021, it was reported that the water level in the Dead Sea was shrinking at a rate of more than one metre per year, and that its surface area had shrunk by about 33% since the 1960s. This was largely due to the diversion of most of the flow into the Dead Sea from the Jordan River.

In June 2021, the project was reportedly abandoned by the Jordanian government, citing a lack of interest by Israel.

== Project features and benefits ==
The proposed conveyance would have pumped seawater 230 meters uphill from the Red Sea's Gulf of Aqaba through the Arabah Valley in Jordan. The water would then flow down gravitationally through multiple pipelines to the area of the Dead Sea, followed by a drop through a penstock to the level of the Dead Sea near its shore, thence via an open canal to the Sea itself, which lies about 420 meters below sea level. The project would have used about 225 km of pipelines for seawater and brine, parallel to the Arabah Valley in Jordan. The project would also have required about 178 km of freshwater pipelines to the Amman area, as well as several water desalination plants and at least one hydroelectric plant. In its final phase, it would have produced about 850 million cubic meters of freshwater per year.

The project would have required electric power from the Jordanian power grid. It would also have provided some electricity through hydroelectric power but would probably have been a large net user of energy. The net power demand would have had to be satisfied through other power projects whose costs are not included in the project costs. The Kingdom of Jordan had planned to build a large nuclear power plant to make up at least some of the difference.

== Costs and financing ==
The project cost estimates varied from two to more than ten billion dollars, depending on its structure and stages. The first phase of the Jordan Red Sea Project was expected to cost US$2.5 billion, and to be financed to a large extent from commercial sources, including debt and equity and soft international financing. As of January 2019, Israel had been expected to contribute over one billion dollars over a period of 25 years.

== Environmental impact ==
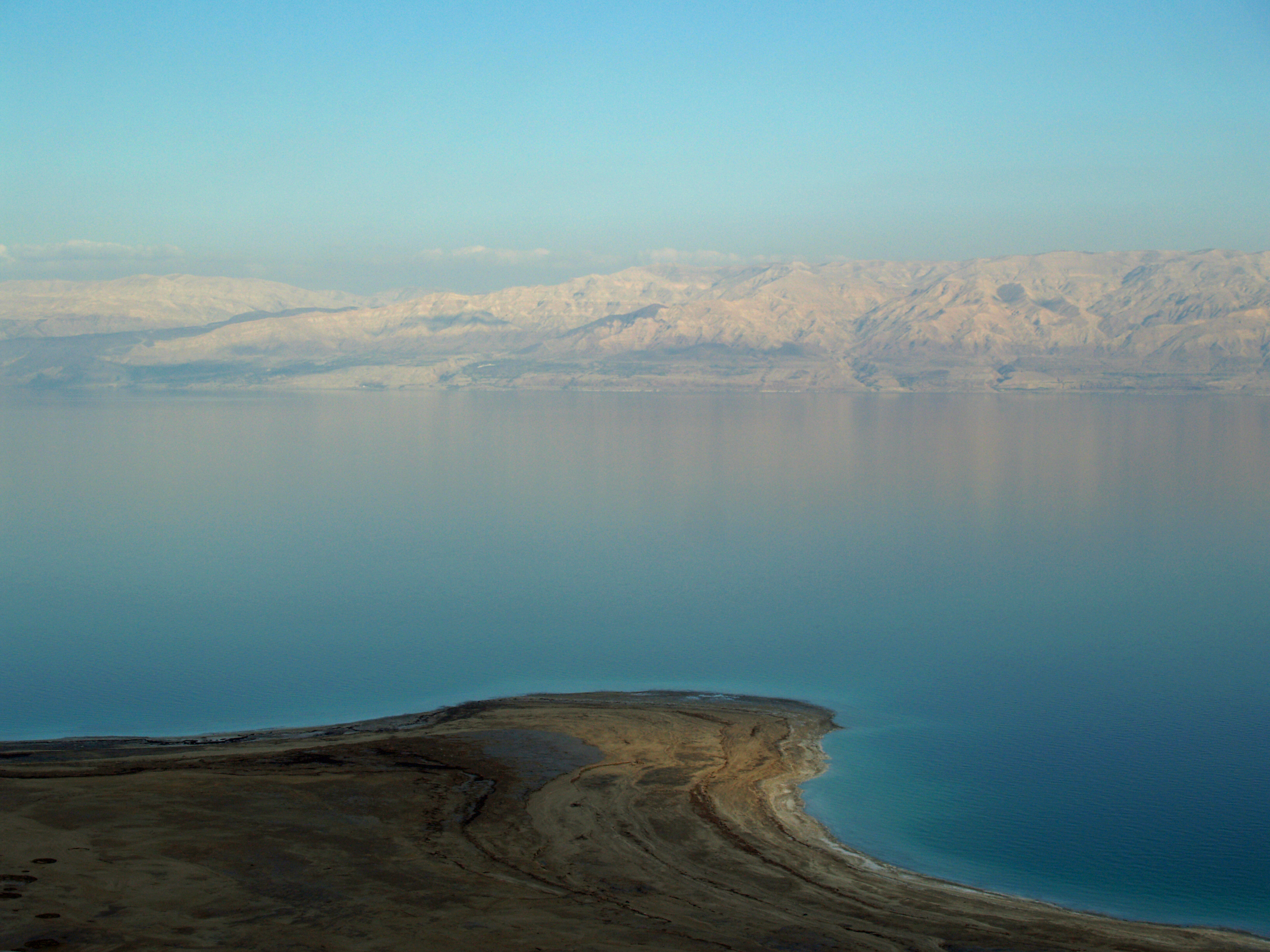
View of the Dead Sea

The transfer of mass volumes of water from one sea to another can have drastic consequences on the unique natural characteristics of each of the seas, as well as on the desert valley which separates them, the Arabah. Some of these characteristics, especially in the Dead Sea area, are unique on a global perspective, and therefore crucially important for conservation. The environmental group EcoPeace Middle East has protested against the allegedly premature approval of the project. By the mid-2000s, the group listed several potential hazardous effects of the project on the unique natural systems of the Red Sea, the Dead Sea, and the Arabah. Some have argued that these risks are serious enough to necessitate further discussion; others feel that their effects are negligible. In August 2011, the World Bank published a study based on environmental assessments carried out under its supervision. A letter to the World Bank was included in its introduction, in which the science team's leader explained that "it is preferable to study and mitigate unexpected impacts and phenomena which may arise when seawater first mixes in the Dead Sea, before a full scale RSDSC is implemented."

=== Dead Sea composition ===
There is a risk of damage to the unique natural system of the Dead Sea, due to mixing its water with Red Sea water, or brines created from the process of desalinating Red Sea water which has a different chemical composition. This potential damage includes changes in water salinity, massive formation of gypsum, formation of volatile toxic compounds, changes in water evaporation rates, changes in the composition of bacteria and algae which inhabit the sea surface, chemical changes in the rocks which surround the water, and loss of unique health benefits that account for much of the tourist attraction to the Dead Sea area.

The report of Tahal Group, the Geological Survey of Israel, Portland State University, Oregon, US and Institute of Life Sciences at the Hebrew University of Jerusalem, states:

- "In order to stabilize the Dead Sea level, more than 700 MCM/yr (million cubic metres/year) of additional water is needed."
- "The present conditions of the Dead Sea will be maintained at least up to inflow volume of about 400 MCM/yr".
- "Potential for biological blooming exists only when stratification develops and the upper mixed layer is diluted by at least 10%"
- "Once stratification develops and mixing occurs in the upper water column, there is a potential for "whitening"
- Stratification may develop above inflow of 500–600 MCM/yr.

=== Gulf of Aqaba coral reefs ===
There is a risk of damage to the coral reefs of the Gulf of Aqaba, due to water pumping. The coral reefs have so far resisted bleaching despite climate change, but the conveyance could upset this balance.

The report of Thetis SpA, the Interuniversity Institute For Marine Sciences in Eilat, Marine Science Station University of Jordan and Yarmouk University, Aqaba and Israel Oceanographic and Limnological Research institute, states:

- "The exchanges of water between the Gulf and the northern Red Sea through the Strait of Tiran are several orders of magnitude larger than those that would be induced by the proposed abstraction flows, such that the latter would likely be imperceptible except in the immediate vicinity of the sink. The expected effect of the abstraction on the heat budget of the gulf is also expected to be negligible."
- "Based on above assessments our findings are for a 'go' decision, as long as the intake configuration, location, and depth are selected properly."

=== Arabah ecosystem ===
The scheme had the potential to cause Damage to the natural landscape and ecosystem of the Arabah, due to the construction process, and the increase in humidity caused by the open canal segments.

According to the preferred scenario of the World Bank Study the conduit will be multiple buried pipelines and not canals. Special care will be taken to minimize the environmental and archeological damage.

=== Arabah aquifer ===
There is a risk of damage to the aquifer of the Arabah, due to contamination of groundwater with water from the Red Sea. The alluvial deposits in Wadi Araba contain important supplies of fresh water. In the event that the pipeline ruptures (due to earthquake risk given the location in the Jordan Rift Valley), these aquifers will be irreparably damaged. This can have fatal consequences to both the agriculture and ecosystem of the Arabah.

The planning and construction of the pipelines will include measures to minimize the potential for pipeline ruptures.

=== Archeological heritage ===
There are also potential threats to the archeological heritage of the area if construction proceeded. The pipeline will cross areas of important cultural heritage, such as Wadi Finan, where the earliest copper mining and extraction in the world took place.

=== Other arguments ===
Israeli environmental NGOs say that the reestablishment of the Jordan River to its natural state was a better solution to the decline of the Dead Sea than the proposed canal.

In 2005, the proposal also generated some concern by the chairman of Egypt's Suez Canal Authority, who argued that the canal will increase seismic activity in the region, provide Israel with water for cooling its nuclear reactor near Dimona, develop settlements in the Negev Desert, and increase well salinity. However, as proposed, most of the desalinated water was expected to be used by Jordan. Under the most recent proposal, water sufficient only to prevent the Dead Sea from dehydrating would have flowed through the system, preventing salt water flow into wells. The World Bank study recommended re-routing the conduit to avoid the geological faults of the Araba Valley.

A 2019 episode of Nova centered around issues the proposed project aims to solve. The documentary argued that "it would take an enormous amount of water from the Sea of Galilee to stabilize the Dead Sea," citing the Sea of Galilee's loss of more than a hundred billion gallons between 2013 and 2018. On the same program, scientist Ittai Gavrieli discussed indirect problems such as excreting reject brine into the Mediterranean Sea. Gavrieli and others opined that the Dead Sea basin is a unique example of human-caused climate change that would serve as a valuable geological park.

== See also ==
- Disi Water Conveyance
- List of interoceanic canals
- Aqaba–Amman Water Desalination and Conveyance Project
