= 2019 in Jordan =

- Decades: 1990s; 2000s; 2010s; 2020s
- See also: Other events of 2019; Timeline of Jordanian history

Events in the year 2019 in Jordan.

== Incumbents ==
- Monarch – Abdullah II
- Prime Minister – Omar Razzaz

== Events ==
- 13 June – Premiere of the television series Jinn

=== Sport ===
- 12 to 28 July – Jordan competed at the 2019 World Aquatics Championships in South Korea.

== Deaths ==
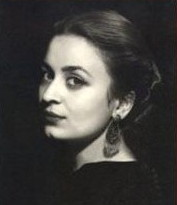
Dina bint Abdul-Hamid

- 26 April – Abdul-Latif Arabiyat, politician (b. 1932/1933).
- 14 August – Suleiman Bakhit, entrepreneur and comics writer (b. 1977/1978).
- 21 August – Dina bint Abdul-Hamid, princess, Queen consort (b. 1929).
- 31 October – Amjad Nasser, writer and poet (b. 1955).
- 9 November – Zaid Kilani, gynecologist (b. 1938).
- 26 November – Madiha Rashid Al-Madfai, radio broadcaster.
