= 2018 in Jordan =

- Decades: 1990s; 2000s; 2010s; 2020s
- See also: Other events of 2018; Timeline of Jordanian history

Events in the year 2018 in Jordan.

== Incumbents ==
- Monarch – Abdullah II
- Prime Minister – Hani Mulki

== Events ==
- 29 January – the Royal Tank Museum opened in Amman.
- 12 August - Jordanian forces raided a militant group in Al-Salt, Balqa Governorate, leading to the deaths of four security officials and three suspected militants.

== Deaths ==
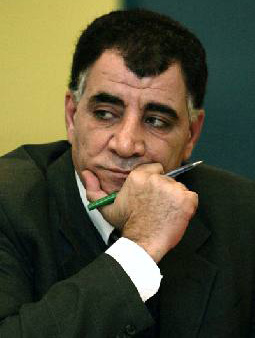
Jamal Naji

- 19 March – Fahed Fanek 83, economist.
- 6 May – Jamal Naji, novelist (b.1954)
- 6 November – Ina'am Al-Mufti, politician, Minister of Social Development (1979–1984) (b. 1929).
