= Hayfa Baytar =

Syrian writer and ophthalmologist

- هيفاء باسيل البيطار
- Born: Hayfa Basil al-Baytar; 1960 (age 65–66); Latakia, Second Syrian Republic
- Education: University of Latakia, Damascus University
- Occupations: novelist; short story writer; journalist; ophthalmologist
- Writing career
- Years active: 1992
- Genres: Novel; short story; essays and articles
- Notable works: The Fallen (2000); The Whore (2003); A Woman of this Modern Age (2004)
- Literary movement: Realism, Feminism

Hayfa Basil al-Baytar (Arabic: هيفاء باسيل البيطار, ALA-LC: Hayfāʼ Bāsil al-Bayṭār; also transliterated :Haifa Bitar; born 1960) is a Syrian novelist, short story writer and ophthalmologist. She has won the Abi Al Qassem Al Shabbi prize for her collections The Fallen (2000) and The Whore (2003).

== Biography and career ==
=== Early years ===
Hayfa Basil al-Baytar was born in 1960 Latakia under Second Syrian Republic, and raised there, the principal port city of Syria. She finished her primary, middle and high school studies at her hometown, then studied at the Faculty of Medicine at University of Latakia, and graduated in 1982. She continued her postgraduate studies at Al-Mowasat Hospital of Damascus University, where she specialized in ophthalmology, and graduated in 1986. After graduating in Damascus, she returned to her hometown to work as an ophthalmologist in Lattakia Governmental Hospital and her private clinic for many years.

After that, she traveled for a year to Paris to study, and also prepared many studies on the causes of blindness and other diseases in her field of specialization. She also attended courtesy of the Bureau of Educational and Cultural Affairs at the US Department of State.

=== Literary career ===
Her literary career began in the early 1990s, and she has become known as a feminist writer as well as a realist. Her works are also categorized under Arabic and Syrian Feminist and Psychological fiction.

Her first literary work, titled Wurūd lan tamūt, is a collection of stories, published in 1992, and she published another collection titled Qiṣaṣ muhāǧirah in 1993. Her first novel Yawmiyat miṭalaqah was published in 1994. She entered journalism, and wrote social, literary and critical essays published in a number of Syrian and Arab newspapers, magazines, websites and periodicals such as Al-Thawra and As-Safir. Because of her criticism of corruption, she faced problems including censorship of her works in her country. She participated in the first and second conferences, which were held in 2001 and 2002 at Georgetown University in Washington D.C, lectured about the form of women in contemporary Arab literature. She joined the Arab Writers Union in 1994 and was honored by the union officials during The Damascus Spring.

She is known for her social reality style. A Jouhina Magazine journalist described her as a humanist and realist who presents socially-reflected reality in all its aspects, writing, "Her work in medicine has helped her to live with many human cases, and present them in a distinguished manner and literary sense." She is considered to be "a writer who enjoys a style dominated by the spirit of rebellion and daring in her weaving of stories from our contemporary reality." She stated in July 2021 that she likes "to present my truth or my soul honestly to my readers and to the whole world".

At the beginning of the third decade of her literary career, she expressed she was influenced by Dostoevsky, who "I consider him not only the greatest novelist, but the founder of psychology, because he is more important than Freud in my opinion." and loves the writings of "Balzac, Kundera, Henry Miller, Mario Llosa, and others, and among the Arab writers, I love the writings of Tahar Ben Jelloun, Amin Maalouf, Sonallah Ibrahim, Jamal Naji, Abdullah Bin Bakheet and others."

She has been described as an "outspoken" novelist in The New Yorker and has participated in public discussion forums about a variety of topics.

=== Critical reception ===
According to Abir Hamdar, writing in The Female Suffering Body: Illness and Disability in Modern Arabic Literature (2014), her work "repeatedly seeks to offer an insight into the gritty reality of women's lives in the Arab world", and her novels and short stories "focus on tragic female characters who suffer social and psychological injury either at the hands of men or because of their own misplaced ideals and aspirations." Her 2004 novel Imraʾa min Hadtha al-ʿAsr features the protagonist Maryam and her experience with breast cancer, with her unsuccessful relationships with men in the background, and became the subject of wide criticism for its inclusion of taboo subjects, including female sexuality.

Her novel A Woman of Fifty has a middle-aged protagonist who engages a lover, whom according to Samira Aghacy, writing in Ageing in the Modern Arabic Novel, "despises older women" and has an attitude that "reveals the 'double standard of ageing' since society is permissive of sexual activity in older men, but more severe and fanatical when it comes to the older women's sexuality." Her 2002 short story The Din of the Body (Dhajeej al-Jasad) focuses on Indou, a Sri Lankan maid subject to a variety of abuses by her female employer.

According to Lovisa Berg, writing in Masculinity and Syrian Fiction: Gender, Society and the Female Gaze, Bitar is one of several writers of her era who "create male characters who perform masculinities perceived by the other characters as one, or a mixture of, the following: weak, oppressive, traditionalist (meant in a negative way), aggressive, feminized, misogynistic or idealistic." Her novel One-Winged Eagle has a male protagonist, a doctor named Karim with financial difficulties despite his profession, which according to Berg, "contrasts the pressure Karim puts on himself with the demands his sister places on men in general to provide for her." In her novel The Abbaseen Basement (1995), the protagonist is the daughter Khulud, who "decides to take revenge on all men because of what her father has done to her mother." Her novel Small Joys - Final Joys (1998) follows the protagonist Hiyam as she lives with a Syrian man in Paris while they both attend graduate school, and after they are married, with a focus on the changing moral views of her husband over time.

== Honors and awards ==
- Abi Al Qassem Al Shabbi prize in Tunisia for her collection The Fallen (2000)
- Abi Al Qassem Al Shabbi prize in Tunisia for her collection The Whore (2003)

== Bibliography ==
An Abjjad list of her works:

=== Short stories ===
- Arabic: ورود لن تموت, romanized: Wurūd lan tamūt, 1992
- Arabic: قصص مهاجرة, romanized: Qiṣaṣ muhāǧirah, 1993
- Arabic: ضجيج الجسد, romanized: Ḍajīj al-jasad, lit. 'The Din of the Body', 1993 & 2006, ISBN 9786144210260
- Arabic: غروب وكتابة, romanized: Ghurūb wa-Kitābah, lit. 'Dusk and Writing', 1994, ISBN 9786144210277, ISBN 9789953879161
- Arabic: خواطر في مقهى رصيف, romanized: Khawāṭir fī maqhá raṣīf, 1995
- Arabic: فضاء كالقفص, romanized: Faḍāʼ ka-al-qafaṣ, 1995, ISBN 9781855164598
- Arabic: كومبارس, romanized: Kūmbārs, 1996 & 2007, ISBN 1855167182
- Arabic: ظل أسود حي, romanized: Ẓill aswad ḥayy, 1997
- Arabic: موت البجعة, romanized: Mawt al-bajʻah, 1997
- Arabic: الساقطة, romanized: al-Sāqiṭah, lit. 'The Fallen' also translated as "The Whore", 2000, ISBN 9786144214886, ISBN 9789953879437
- Arabic: عطر الحب, romanized: ʻIṭr al-ḥubb, 2002, translated as Love Struck by Hannah Benninger, 2014
- Arabic: يكفي أن يحبك قلب واحد لتعيش, romanized: Yakfī an yuḥibbuk qalb wāḥid li-ta‘īsh, 2008
- Arabic: مهزومة بصداقتك, romanized: Mahzūmah bi-ṣadāqatik, lit. 'Defeated by your friendship', 2008
- Arabic: مطر جاف, romanized: Maṭar jāff, lit. 'Dry Rain', 2008, ISBN 9786144214725, ISBN 9789953873978
- Arabic: صندوق الضمير الأزرق, romanized: Ṣundūq al-ḍamīr al-azraq, 2009, ISBN 9786144214725
- Arabic: S.M.S., 2010, ISBN 9781855166585
- Arabic: طفل التفاح, romanized: Ṭifl al-tuffāḥ, 2016, ISBN 9786140227408, ISBN 9786140118515

=== Novels ===
- Arabic: يوميات مطلقة, romanized: Yawmiyat miṭalaqah, lit. 'Diaries of a Divorcee', 1994, ISBN 9786144210307
- Arabic: قبو العباسيين, romanized: Qabw al-ʻAbbāsīyīn, 1995, ISBN 9786144210284, ISBN 9789953872971
- Arabic: أفراح صغيرة، أفراح أخيرة, romanized: Afrāḥ ṣaghīrah, afrāḥ akhīrah, lit. 'Small Celebrations . . . Last Celebrations', 1996, ISBN 9789953872780
- Arabic: نسر بجناح وحيد, romanized: Nisr bi-janāḥ waḥīd, lit. 'One Winged Eagle', 1998, ISBN 9789953879291
- Arabic: امرأة من طابقين, 1999, ISBN 9786144210253, ISBN 9789953296883
- Arabic: أيقونة بلا وجه, romanized: Ayqūnah bi-lā wajh, 2000, ISBN 9786144258101
- Arabic: امرأة من هذا العصر, romanized: Imraʾa min Hadtha al-ʿAsr, lit. 'A Woman of this Modern Age', 2006, ISBN 1855166259
- Arabic: أبواب مواربة, romanized: Abwāb muwāribah, 2002, ISBN 9786144210239, ISBN 9789953870175
- Arabic: هوى, romanized: Hawá, 2007, ISBN 9786144210291
- Arabic: نساء بأقفال, 2007, ISBN 9786144214763, ISBN 9789953874852
- Arabic: أحلام نازفة, 2009, ISBN 9786144214879
- Arabic: وجوه من سوريا, romanized: Wujūh min Sūriyā, 2013, ISBN 9786144257326
- Arabic: امرأة في الخمسين, romanized: Imraʼah fī al-khamsīn, lit. 'A Woman of Fifty', 2013, ISBN 9786144258057 ISBN 9786144257098
- Arabic: الشحاذة, romanized: al-Shaḥḥādhah, 2018, ISBN 9789178378814

=== Non-fiction ===
- Arabic: نسائم الأفكار ؛ نصوص ومقالات, 2010, ISBN 9789933431112
