= Bakheet =

Bakheet (Arabic: بخيت), also transliterated Bakhet or Bakhit, and sometimes even Bekheet or Bekhit, and also sometimes preceded by Al- or El- (Arabic: البخيت), is an Arabic surname.

The original root Bakht is Persian, and means "fortune, happiness".

Notable people with this surname include:

- Abdullah Bin Bakheet, Saudi journalist and novelist
- Amina Bakhit, Sudanese middle-distance runner
- Bakhit Khamis (born 1992), Sudanese footballer
- Marouf al-Bakhit, Jordanian politician
- Masoud Bakheet, Saudi footballer
- Mohammed Abduh Bakhet, Qatari long-distance runner
- Mohammad Al-Bakhit, Jordanian Taekwondo practitioner
- Omer Mohamed Bakhit, Sudanese footballer
- Rawya Bekhit, Emirati volleyball player
- Saad Bakheet Mubarak, Emirati footballer
- Salem Nasser Bakheet, Bahraini athlete
- Suleiman Bakhit, Jordanian entrepreneur
- Waleed Al-Bekheet, Kuwaiti hammer thrower
- Yaseen Al-Bakhit, Jordanian footballer
- Zuhair Bakheet, Emirati footballer
