= 2017 in Jordan =

- Decades: 1990s; 2000s; 2010s; 2020s
- See also: Other events of 2017; Timeline of Jordanian history

Events from the year 2017 in Jordan

== Incumbents ==
- Monarch – Abdullah II
- Prime Minister – Hani Mulki

== Events ==
- February – After Donald Trump's inauguration as the President of the United States, Abdullah II traveled to the US on an official visit.

== Deaths ==
- 8 January – Klaib Al-Fawwaz, diplomat and politician, Minister of State for Cabinet Affairs (b. 1950).
- 8 February – Georges El-Murr, Archbishop of the Melkite Greek Catholic Archeparchy of Petra and Philadelphia in Amman (b. 1930).
- 25 July – Rula Quawas, feminist academic (b. 1960).
