= 2014 in Jordan =

- Decades: 1990s; 2000s; 2010s; 2020s
- See also: Other events of 2014; Timeline of Jordanian history

The following lists events that happened during 2014 in Jordan.

== Incumbents ==
- Monarch: Abdullah II
- Prime Minister: Abdullah Ensour

== Events ==
=== March ===
- March 10 - A Jordanian judge is fatally shot by the Israeli Border Police after he allegedly attempted to grab one of their rifles.

=== April ===
- April 16 - Jordanian warplanes strike a convoy of vehicles as they were trying to enter Jordan from Syria.

=== December ===
- December 21 - After an eight-year informal moratorium on the death penalty, Jordan executes 11 men.
- December 24 - A Royal Jordanian Air Force warplane crashes, and its pilot is captured by Islamic State of Iraq and the Levant militants near the city of Raqqa in northern Syria.
