= 2016 in Jordan =

- Decades: 1990s; 2000s; 2010s; 2020s
- See also: Other events of 2016; Timeline of Jordanian history

The following lists events that happened during 2016 in Jordan.

== Incumbents ==
- Monarch - Abdullah II
- Prime Minister - Abdullah Ensour, and Hani Mulki

== Events ==
=== May ===
- 29 May - Parliament is dissolved by King Abdullah.

=== September ===
- 20 September - 2016 Jordanian general election.

=== November ===
- 4 November - King Faisal Air Base shooting
- 7 November - Abdullah II of Jordan opens the 18th Parliament of Jordan with his speech from the throne.

=== December ===
- 18 December - 2016 Al-Karak attack
