= 2011 in Jordan =

- Decades: 1990s; 2000s; 2010s; 2020s
- See also: Other events of 2011; Timeline of Jordanian history

The following lists events from the year 2011 in Jordan.

== Incumbents ==
- Monarch - Abdullah II
- Prime Minister
  - Samir Rifai (until 1 February)
  - Marouf al-Bakhit (9 February-24 October)
  - Awn Al-Khasawneh (starting 24 October)

== Events ==
=== January ===
- January 1 - Ro'ya TV is launched.
- January 14 - Protests began, demanding the resignation of Prime Minister Samir Rifai and complaints about soaring food prices, which would continue into 2012.
- January 21 - Thousands of Jordanians protest in the streets against prices rising and demanding the resignation of several ministers.

=== February ===
- February 1 - In response to the protests, King Abdullah II of Jordan sacks the cabinet of Rifai.

=== April ===
- April 1 - Police attempt to separate pro and anti-government demonstrators in Amman.

=== October ===
- October 24 - Awn Shawkat Al-Khasawneh's cabinet takes office.
