= 2020 in Jordan =

- Decades: 2000s; 2010s; 2020s
- See also: Other events of 2020; Timeline of Jordanian history

Events in the year 2020 in Jordan.

== Incumbents ==
- Monarch – Abdullah II

== Events ==
- March 2 – First case of the COVID-19 pandemic in Jordan.
- March 12 – 15 – 2020 Middle East storms.

== Predicted and Scheduled Events ==
- November - 2020 Jordanian general election.
