= 2015 in Jordan =

- Decades: 1990s; 2000s; 2010s; 2020s
- See also: Other events of 2015; Timeline of Jordanian history

The following lists events that happened during 2015 in the Hashemite Kingdom of Jordan.

== Incumbents ==
- Monarch: Abdullah II
- Prime Minister: Abdullah Ensour

== Events ==
- January - Clashes between 2,000 protesters and police.
- November - November 9, Amman shooting attack
