= 2013 in Jordan =

- Decades: 1990s; 2000s; 2010s; 2020s
- See also: Other events of 2013; Timeline of Jordanian history

The following lists events that happened during 2013 in the Hashemite Kingdom of Jordan.

== Incumbents ==
- Monarch - Abdullah II
- Prime Minister - Abdullah Ensour

== Events ==
=== January ===
- January 23 - A parliamentary election is held with boycotting by the opposition, alleging a fraud.
