= 2010 in Jordan =

- Decades: 1990s; 2000s; 2010s; 2020s
- See also: Other events of 2010; Timeline of Jordanian history

The following lists events that happened during 2010 in Jordan.

== Incumbents ==
- Monarch - Abdullah II
- Prime Minister - Samir Rifai

== Events ==
=== April ===
- April 22 - Two rockets are fired into Jordanian territory by Palestinian militants. One explodes near Aqaba and damages a warehouse, the other falls into the Red Sea.

=== August ===
- August 2 - A Jordanian civilian is killed and three others are wounded as a Grad rocket launched from the Sinai hits the city of Aqaba. Four other rockets land in open areas in the Gulf of Aqaba. Jordan, Israel, Egypt and the United States condemn the attack.
- August 3 - Jordan says it has evidence that a fatal Grad-type rocket strike on Aqaba originated in Egypt's Sinai Peninsula.

=== November ===
- November 9 - Jordanian parliamentary election is boycotted by the opposition Islamic Action Front.
- November 10 - King Abdullah II meets with Xu Caihou, vice chairman of China's Central Military Commission, in Amman.
- November 22 - King Abdullah II commissions the Prime Minister Samir Rifai to form a new government following recent elections.
