= Ina'am Al-Mufti =

Jordanian politician (1929–2018)

Ina'am As'ad Kaddoura Al-Mufti

Minister of Social Development
- In office 8 August 1980 – 10 January 1984

Minister of Social Development
- In office 3 July 1980 – 28 August 1980

Minister of Social Development
- In office 19 December 1979 – 3 July 1980

Personal details
- Born: 26 February 1929 (Palestine) Safad
- Died: 6 November 2018 (aged 89) Amman - Jordan
- Spouse: Adnan Al-Mufti

Ina'am Qaddoura Al-Mufti (Arabic: إنعام قدورة المفتي; February 26, 1929 – 6 November 2018) was the first Jordanian woman to hold a governmental position.

== Biography ==
Qaddoura established the Ministry of Social Development, Noor Al-Hussein Foundation, Women Issues Organization, Jubilee School of Amman, Children's Trust, Union of Jordanian Women, and National Union for Jordanian Business Women. She was also a part of UNESCO, spoke on several radio shows spreading awareness, and was a part of writing a book used in all schools in the kingdom.

Qaddoura was a member of the Senate, the Upper House of the National Assembly of Jordan.

== Honorary office and memberships ==
Honorary office and memberships:

- Member of several universities like the University of Applied Sciences, Mutah University, Yarmouk University, Faculty of Princess Tharwat,
- A member of the King Hussein Foundation and the Noor Al Hussein Foundation and its projects,
- A member of the International Council of the Federation of World Colleges,
- A member of the Arab Council for Childhood and Development,
- A member of the Steering Committee (adult education) \ UNESCO,
- A member of the Senate,
- Member of the Board of Education in the Ministry of Education,
- President of the Alumni Club American University in Cairo \ Amman,
- Member of the Arab Thought Forum,
- Member of the Committee on Education and Culture and the media,
- A member of the committee on health, environment and social development,
- A member of the Foreign Affairs Committee
