= Rawya Bekhit =

Emirati volleyball player (born 1986)

Personal information
- Nationality: Emirati
- Born: 25 September 1986 (age 40)

Volleyball information
- Number: 6 (national team)

National team
2011	United Arab Emirates

Rawya Bekhit (born 25 September 1986) is an Emirati female volleyball player. She was part of the United Arab Emirates women's national volleyball team. She participated at the 2011 Pan Arab Games, winning the bronze medal.
