= Jubilee School =

High school in Amman, Jordan

The Jubilee School
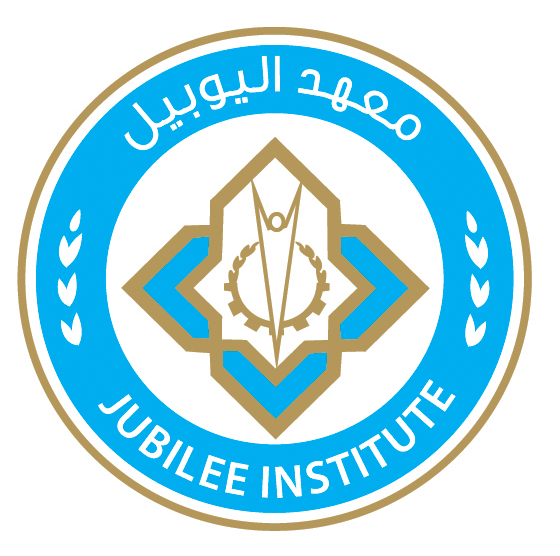
- Shafa Badran; Amman; Jordan

Information
- Type: Mixed-sex independent day school
- Motto: "Towards Excellence in Education"
- Established: 1993
- Principal: Suha Jua'aneh Shahin
- Age range: 14-18
- Enrollment: 9th grade
- Student to teacher ratio: 6:1
- Colors: Blue and gold
- Website: http://www.jubilee.edu.jo

The Jubilee School, also known as The Jubilee Institute, is a non-profit, independent, residential, co-educational high school dedicated for Jordanian gifted students located in Amman, Jordan.

== History ==
The project to establish the school was announced in 1977, during Jordan's Silver Jubilee celebrations of King Hussein's accession to the throne, as a tribute to His Majesty's development efforts, especially in the field of education. In 1984, Queen Noor accepted responsibility for the as yet unrealized project, and a year later it became one of the major undertakings of the newly established Noor Al Hussein Foundation.

After being temporarily housed in a Ministry of Education building, the school opened its doors in 1993 to eighty-nine ninth graders admitted for their academic achievement. In 1997 the school celebrated its first graduating class. In 1995, H. M. King Hussein laid the cornerstone for the first phase of the construction of the school's permanent home in Yajouz outside Amman, and in early 1998 the school moved from its temporary site to its permanent place.

In 2000, the ownership of the Jubilee School for Gifted and Talented Students was transferred from the Noor Al Hussein Foundation to the newly established King Hussein Foundation as its first project in the area of education and leadership.

== Campus ==
The campus area is 124,000 square meters while the building area is approximately 13,000 square meters which hosts the following:

- 20 classrooms
- 1 Chemistry lab
- 1 Electronics lab
- 1 Biology lab
- 3 Computer labs
- 1 Ecology lab
- 2 Robotics labs
- A dedicated Deutsche classroom
- A dedicated French classroom
- A sports complex (including a Squash field, two halls for music and art education, tennis field, table tennis area, 400m running track, one indoor and two outdoor playing fields, and an indoor Olympic swimming pool)
- An Information Resource Center
- 2 multipurpose halls
- Common dining area
- Male and female dormitories.
- A library
- A clinic
- A dedicated Tawjihi program building
- A school theater

=== School uniform ===
The school requires school uniform for all students. The uniform in summer consists of dark navy trousers, and a white shirt. In winter students wear a uniform hoodie or sweaters above shirts. Students are allowed to wear whatever they want on top of that if they still feel cold. Colored t-shirts under the uniform shirt are usually unaccepted. Casual clothing is allowed on the last Thursday of each month where students are free to wear whatever they want, as long as it follows the standards of modest clothing, short bottoms such as skirts, shorts, and dresses that are above the knees are not accepted.

=== Curriculum ===
Newly admitted students attend an orientation program during the summer prior to enrollment. The 5-6 week program acquainting new students with the school environment. The academic program consists of two main programs:

- Enriched Ministry of Education Curriculum (mandatory for all grades 9-12).
- Special Jubilee Program (mandatory for grades 9 -11 only). It consists of:

Compulsory courses:

- Leadership Education (3 courses)
- Communication Skills (3 courses)
- Counseling (5 courses)
- Community Service (120 hours)

Elective courses: At least 2 courses per semester are chosen by students from more than 60 subjects.

== Admission to the school ==
Students who wish to be part of the Jubilee school program apply for an exam that determines their mental capability. The test has three parts: Maths, Logic and Verbal. Students who pass the test qualify to an interview. Students who pass the interview are called back and told that they are accepted in the Jubilee school. New students participate in a 2-week summer program that develops their scientific, and characteristic skills before joining the school. During the summer program students take part in tests that calculate their IQ and mental capabilities.

== Extracurricular activities ==
Students activities include:

- student-exchange programs,
- competitions, workshops and seminars,
- computer networking,
- camping and voluntary work,
- community service programs (implemented at homes and institutions that work in the fields of child care, special needs, senior citizens and environment preservation),
- student exchange programs (offering exchange with schools from both Arab and non-Arab area),
- JubiTech - an annual technology exhibition about computer programming, design and other IT applications,
- Career week,
- website design competitions,
- the teacher and student exchange, in which students and teachers change their role in order for students to experience teacher problems and vice versa.

== Graduation ==
There are four requirements that students have to accomplish in three years:

- Successful completion of the Ministry of Education curriculum,
- Successful completion of the Jubilee School curriculum (mandatory and elective courses),
- Fulfillment of 120 hours of community service.
- Completion and submission of a graduation project.

== Financial status ==
The school depends on charity and governmental support to run, and donations in the form of computers and lab equipment. Nevertheless, Jubilee school does not reject applicants who cannot afford the fee which is 3000 Jordanian Dinars (about $4300 or €3300). Instead, it estimates fees for each student based on their parents' financial status.
