= Rula Quawas =

Jordanian academic

- Born: 25 February 1960; Amman, Jordan
- Died: 25 July 2017 (aged 57); Amman, Jordan
- Education: University of Jordan, University of North Texas
- Occupation: Educator

Dr. Rula Butros Audeh Quawas (25 February 1960 – 25 July 2017) was a Jordanian academic known for her advocacy for women's advancement in Jordan and as the first academic to introduce courses on feminism at the University of Jordan.

== Biography ==
Quawas was born on 25 February 1960 in Amman, Jordan. She attended Al Ahliyya School for Girls in her youth, where her mother was a teacher. She earned her B.A. in 1981 and her M.A. in 1991 from the University of Jordan while simultaneously teaching at high schools in Amman. She went on to earn her Ph.D. from the University of North Texas.

Following her doctorate, she returned to the University of Jordan, where she would go on to teach for over twenty years. She was the first professor to teach feminist theory courses in the English Department. She founded the university's Women's Studies Center in 2006 and served as Director from 2006 to 2008. She also founded the Knowledge Production Unit at the Jordanian National Commission for Women. She was Dean of the Faculty of Foreign Languages at the University of Jordan from 2011 to 2012. During the 2013–4 academic year, she was a Fulbright Scholar in Residence at Champlain College in Vermont.

Quawas has been described as a "prominent champion of women's advancement in Jordan" whose "lifelong goal was to empower young women and challenge patriarchal structures" (13). Describing her own sense of purpose, Quawas wrote in 2017:

"Arab women believe education to be their weapon....As a professor of literature and feminist theory, I have always glimpsed the possibility of a world that could be much more for Arab women. When I teach, I always ask myself, What is it that I can do within the domain of my classrooms to make this world a living reality? What kind of future do I want to create with my students?"

In 2009, Princess Basma conferred Quawas the Meritorious Honor Award for Leadership and Dedication to the Empowerment of Jordanian Women. She was a nominee for the U.S. State Department's International Women of Courage Award in 2013.

Quawas died on July 25, 2017, in Amman, Jordan, at the age of 57, due to complications of a biopsy.

=== Controversy at the University of Jordan (2012) ===
Quawas started her position as Dean of the Faculty of Foreign Languages at the University of Jordan in 2011, for what was meant to be a two-year deanship. However, halfway through her contract, she was dismissed by the university's president after defending students' rights to produce a video in her Feminist Theory class responding to campus sexual harassment. She learned of her dismissal not from the university administration but through local media. She was allowed to continue to teach after her removal as dean.

By some accounts, Quawas "became a household name in the country" following this controversy. Her early dismissal resulted in considerable domestic and international outcry, including by the Middle East Studies Association of North America and many individual scholars around the world. Writing in 2017, Quawas stood by the video as "revolutionary and heterodox in more than one way" and maintained that she had been surprised at the extent to which she and her students were "demonized and deprecated" following the video's public release.

=== Select publications ===
- Bad Girls of the Arab World. Yaqub, Nadia and Rula Quawas (editors). Austin: University of Texas Press. 2017.
- The Voice of Being Enough: Young Jordanian Women Break Through Without Breaking Down. Quawas, Rula (editor). 2016.
- "'A sea captain in her own right': Navigating the feminist thought of Huda Shaarawi." Quawas, Rula. 2006. Journal of International Women's Studies 8(1): 219–235.
- "Pinched lives and stolen dreams in Arab feminist short stories." Quawas, Rula. Journal of International Women's Studies 15(1): 54–66.
