= Abjjad =

Arabic literary social network

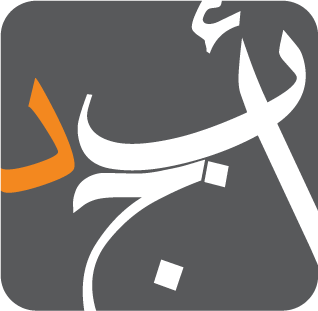
- Website type: Ebook platform
- Available in: Arabic
- CEO: Eman Hylooz
- Website: www.abjjad.com
- Registration: Free
- Launched: June 2012; 14 years ago
- Current status: Active

Abjjad is an Arabic reading application that was launched in June 2012 by Eman Hylooz. Abjjad offers users the ability to download and read thousands of books offline through its iOS and Android applications. In December 2020, Abjjad had more than 1.5 million registered accounts.

== About Abjjad ==
Abjjad was founded in June 2012 by Eman Hylooz as a reader community dedicated to Arab readers, authors, and book lovers. Abjjad developed into a smart electronic platform to provide Arabic electronic books with ease to Arab readers everywhere after discovering a large gap in the world of Arab publishing, which is the legal electronic publishing, by forming strategic partnership with Arab publishers such as Dar Al-Shorouk, Dar Al Tanweer, Dar Al Adab, and Dar Al Saqi.

== History ==
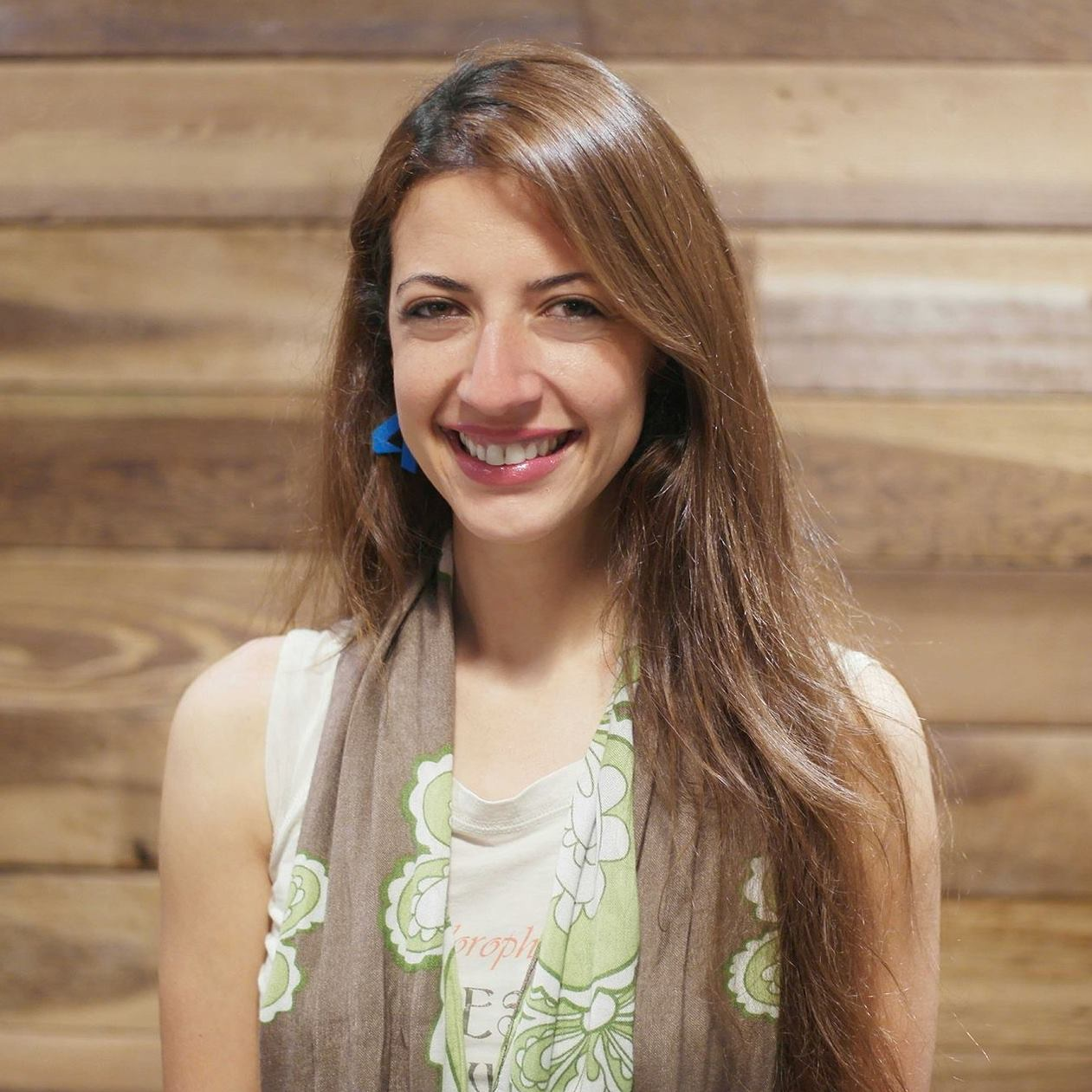
Eman Hylooz, Founder & CEO

In May 2012, Oasis500 provided Abjjad with the seed funding to launch the website. In June 2012, Abjjad was launched with a budget of 15 thousand dollars. Within the first three months more than 10 thousand members were registered in Abjjad. Abjjad has participated in different local and international forums to meet several investors and entrepreneurs. In October 2012 Abjjad participated in Global thinkers forum in Amman, Jordan where Eman Hylooz, founder & CEO, presented the concept of Abjjad, its vision and future plans In mid-December 2012 Abjjad participated in Global Entrepreneurship in Dubai where it was presented to investors as a start-up and a new project in the Middle East. In February 2013 Abjjad was one of ten startups MENA apps has nominated from Jordan and Palestine to participate in startup Turkey. In May 2013 Abjjad participated in World Economic Forum in Amman, Jordan and later in June 2013 participated in Arab Net in Dubai.

By the end of 2013, Abjjad won the Mohammed Bin Rashid Al Maktoum's Best Arab Start-Up Business Award for 2013. During 29 October 2013 till January 2014 Abjjad has launched their campaign for crowd funding through Eureeca Abjjad managed to raise US$161,000 in 88 days from 43 regional donors, over US$40,000 over its initial target.

By the end of 2020. Abjjad had raised a $1 million investment round led by Jordan Entrepreneurship Fund, Ramal Capital Fund, and JordInvest Fund. Because the funds will be used to acquire users and e-books, Abjjad hopes to become the largest Arab electronic library as well as the largest income-generating platform for Arab authors and publishers, while also providing readers with a unique digital reading experience.

== Features ==
- The ability to read an unlimited number of books from an electronic library containing thousands of Arabic and translated books. Abjjad ebook library is constantly expanding and cooperating with new publishing houses to add more books.
- Reading offline without an internet connection. The application allows the user to download books in seconds and read them anywhere.
- Intuitive feature which include the ability to flip the pages of the book, highlight the reader's favorite quotes, and add notes, in addition to night reading mode and the option to modify the style and size of the front.
- The ability to interact with other readers and read their book reviews. More than 1.5 million Arabic readers make up the Abjjad reader community, and the user can read and connect with their reviews, book ratings, and favorite quotes.
- A virtual personal library that enables the user to rate and organize books by placing them on one of the three shelves: I will read it, currently readings, and/or read it.
- Abjjad's library includes various genres and literary fields, such as: reference books, novels, stories, literature, psychological books, philosophy, biography, politics, history, religion, self-improvement and human development books, as well as international books translated into Arabic.
- The library includes the most famous works of Arab authors such as: Naguib Mahfouz, Mahmoud Darwish, Radwa Ashour, Tayeb Salih. Aside from Arabic translation of works by well-known worldwide authors including: Elif Shafak, Fyodor Dostoevsky, Mark Manson, and others.

== Statistics ==
In December 2020, Abjjad had more than 1.5 million registered accounts.

== Awards and honors ==
- 2013: Won the Mohammad Bin Rashid Award for Best Arabic Startup
- 2014: Won the Golden Award for Jawa's "Best Online Community"
- 2015: Won the Business Women of the Year Award by Bank al Etihad
- 2016: Won the Said Khoury Award for Entrepreneurs and Innovators
- 2016: Won the Best Application in the Arabic Region Award by His Highness Sheikh Salem Al-Ali Al-Sabah in Kuwait.
- 2019: Won the Mohammad Bin Rashid Award for Arabic Language for the best artistic, cultural or intellectual world to serve the Arabic language.

== Abjjad in the media ==
Abjjad has taken a huge interest in the Middle Eastern and western media; the author of Startup Rising: The Entrepreneurial Revolution Remaking the Middle East, Christopher M. Schroeder, has interviewed Eman Hylooz and wrote about her experience with Abjjad in his book. In addition, France24-Monte Carlo Doualiya has interviewed Ms. Hylooz on Retweet program to discuss Abjjad idea and provide the latest statistics of the website. Moreover, Sky News Arabia interviewed Hylooz to relate her experience with Oasis500 and Eureeca in Abjjad's crowdinvestment campaignPage text. furthermore, Al-Aan TV interviewed Ms.Hylooz in ArabNet in Dubai, 2013. Abjjad has been mentioned on Oasis500 website as one of the five startups which the company funded and gained different prizes. Wamda, Mediame and crowdfundinsider have discussed Abjjad's experience in the crowd investment on Eureeca. And the expert in the Arabic literature in English, M. Lynx Qualey, has interviewed Eman Hylooz in March 2013 to talk about Abjjad's story of success, how it differs from other social networks and what are its future plans. Abjjad was also featured in "Hashtag Arabi" website when it launched its premium subscription called "Abjjad Unlimited" in 2017 with the support of the Abdul Hameed Shoman Foundation. In her interview with the Jordan Times, Eman also discussed her background in computer science and software development, which helped her found Abjjad.
