= Zaid Kilani =

Jordanian physician (1938–2019)

Zaid Kilani (1938 - 9 November 2019) was a Jordanian physician specializing in obstetrics and gynecology and founder and director of Farah Maternity Hospital in Amman, and a member of the Jordanian Senate. He died on November 9, 2019.

== Early life and education ==
He was born in Nazareth-Palestine, but immigrated to Lebanon with his parents and then to Jordan where he completed his primary education. He obtained his Bachelor of Medicine degree at the University of Göttingen, West Germany, in 1964. He obtained a Diploma in Obstetrics and Gynecology in Ireland in 1975.

In 1977 he obtained a Fellowship of The Royal College of Surgeons of England, London.

== Achievements ==
Founder and Director of Farah Maternity Hospital, Amman, Jordan.
