= Fayfa =

Looted archeological site

Fayfa, or al-Fayfa, is an archaeological site in Jordan located near the Dead Sea. Its remains have been extensively looted.

== History ==
It is believed that Fayfa corresponds with the historic site of Praesidium, a location listed on the 6th century A.D. Madaba Map, rediscovered in 1884.

During the Mamluk period, the area of Fayfa was occupied in order to exploit "the rich agricultural potential of the entire area."

== Threats ==
The site has been subjected to significant looting.
