= Abdullah bin Bakheet =

Saudi journalist

Abdullah bin Bakheet (Arabic: عبد اللّه بن بخيت; born 1952) is a Saudi journalist and novelist. He was born in Riyadh and studied at King Saud University. Upon graduation in 1978, he started working as a journalist for periodicals like Al Yamamah magazine and Al Riyadh and Al Jazirah newspapers. As of 2011 he still wrote a regular column for Al Riyadh and is well known for his liberal views on topics such as women's rights and minority rights. He got into trouble with the Saudi morality police (Commission for the Promotion of Virtue and Prevention of Vice) in 2005 when he was charged with spreading corruption and immorality through his writing.

Bakheet has also written widely outside journalism, including literary and critical works, and television scripts. His recent novel Street of Affections was longlisted for the 2010 Arabic Booker Prize.
