= Suleiman Bakhit =

Jordanian entrepreneur (died 2019)

- سليمان بخيت
- Born: Jordan
- Died: August 14, 2019 (aged 40–41); Spain
- Education: University of Minnesota-Twin Cities
- Occupations: Comic book creator, entrepreneur
- Years active: 2006-2019
- Known for: Founding Aranim, activism against anti-Arab prejudice
- Father: Marouf al-Bakhit

Suleiman Bakhit (Arabic: سليمان بخيت) was a Jordanian entrepreneur who produced superhero comics in various media for Arab youth. He was described as "fighting to change how the West sees Arab youth — and how Arab youth see themselves — one superhero at a time."

== Early life and education ==
Bakhit was born in 1978, the son of Marouf al-Bakhit, who served twice as prime minister of Jordan. Bakhit said that, when he was a child, "I once had an art teacher who refunded my parents' money and advised me never to try again." Suleiman studied at the University of Minnesota-Twin Cities. His original intention was to study mechanical engineering, but after "a couple years," he reportedly "found it utterly intolerable." Instead, he chose to pursue a master's degree in human resources development. His graduation thesis on this subject was "adopted by the Jordanian government."

He was at the University of Minnesota when 9/11 occurred. As president of the university's international student union, he began an "awareness campaign" to combat Anti-Arab racism in the United States. The campaign received considerable media attention and shortly afterwards, Bakhit has said, "four college kids attacked me on my way home late one night. They started with racial slurs, then attacked me with beer bottles. I suffered many scars and injuries that led to surgeries." He decided, "Well, either I pack my bags and go home to Jordan, or I do something. And I decided the best way to fight racism is to start with the young. So I began talking to schoolchildren ages 6 and 7 about Middle Eastern culture and what happened to me on 9/11, spreading a very simple message: Not all Middle Easterners are terrorists, and Al Qaeda is like the KKK." Eventually he "started realizing that mythology and stories have such great power to bridge cultural divides" and also "realized the power of empowering youth and women through positive role models in a medium they can relate to: comics."

In addition, he "realized that actually, no, there aren't any Arab equivalents to Western superheroes. Yes, there's Aladdin and Sinbad, but no one has ever done an animation or comic book based on the actual mythology from within the culture." This recognition led Bakhit to do "a couple of years of hardcore research, reading ancient texts, doing six month's archaeological research in the Arab desert. I even learned Hebrew. I wanted to read Aramaic so I could read the Dead Sea Scrolls for inspiration. Meanwhile, I started to teach myself to draw, and came up with some characters based on my knowledge of Arab culture. It was a journey towards discovering my own culture more than anything else." Over time, he has said, he became convinced that his calling was to create "characters and stories based in Arab tradition to spread the culture of tolerance."

== Return to Jordan and Aranim Media Factory ==
Consequently, he dropped out of the master's program in human resource development, returned to Jordan, and, in 2006, registered his company, Aranim. The name "comes from a combination of 'Arab' and 'anime.'"

After returning to Jordan, Bakhit was physically attacked there, too, "this time," he has said, "for being such…a voice for moderation." According to his account, once he had "started publishing my comic books, especially the ones that fight extremism and terrorism, I got attacked outside of my office by a couple of extremists. One of them hit me with a razor blade in my face. He was trying to take out one of my eyes. Because it was late at night and I drive a motorbike, I had to cauterize my own wound with a pocketknife before getting to a hospital. That's how I ended up with a big, massive scar on my face."

Aranim Media Factory, based in Amman, has become one of the largest producers of comics in the Arab language, it produces comic books, TV and film cartoons, digital comic strips, manga, creative media, and social-media games. His goal is “to entertain but more importantly to inspire Arab boys and girls to believe that real opportunities to be leaders are well within their grasp.” He describes himself as "dealing in hope and tolerance" and says that he wants "to build the Arab Disney." He has said: "I go to a lot of poor areas and ask the kids, 'Who are your role models?' Sometimes they say Zarqawi and Bin Laden. But in one neighborhood I gave them comics and when I went back a few months later; the superheroes were now their role models. It doesn't even have to be real people they look up to. There's a huge lack of positive role models in the region. Superheroes are an aspiration for what we want to be."

Bakhit develops "the concepts, characters and stories" for his comic books, and has a team of writers and artists who translate his ideas into the final product. He also runs "focus groups to gauge what kids respond to." He and his programmers, Jordanian natives, "learned from scratch how to program games. We bought books on Amazon and literally taught ourselves how to program, using blogs and online communities for support." He has said that his firm is "the only Arab company in the entire Arab world that creates social games in-house at the quality that we do."

As an example of the fact that his stories "have deep Middle Eastern mythologies ingrained in them," Bakhit has explained that "in ancient Arabic mythology, fire has seven types, each color corresponding to a different one. So I gave Naar — which means 'fire' — the first hero of my first comic, the power of the seven flames. The story is about a group of kids who wake up in a future post-apocalyptic Middle East to discover they have superpowers." He also created Section 9, a comic "based on Jordan's real-life all-female counterterrorism team," an example of his belief "in empowering young women," and has created a character named Element Zero, "a special agent, kind of the Arabic Jason Bourne or Jack Bauer, who fights terrorism locally."

In January 2010, Bakhit founded Aranim Games. As of July 2011, his firms had sold 1.2 million copies of print comics. In 2011, Aranim Games launched "a FarmVille-style social game called Happy Oasis" which allows players to build a "garden in traditional Islamic style." In 2012, he invented an iPhone game that he described as "combining the Arab Spring and Animal Farm." He has also produced "a web TV show based on Element Zero character."

He died of cancer on August 14, 2019.

== Other activities ==
During the Libyan Civil War, Bakhit and another TED Fellow, Adrian Hong, created "sort of a channel between Libya and Jordan to try to help some of the injured civilians come to Jordanian hospitals." As a result, "over 15,000 injured civilians got treated in Jordanian hospitals."

Bakhit was named a 2011 TED Global Fellow. He spoke at the TED Global conference in Edinburgh in 2011.

Bakhit spoke at the Oslo Freedom Forum in May 2014.
