= Jamal Naji =

Palestinian-born Jordanian author

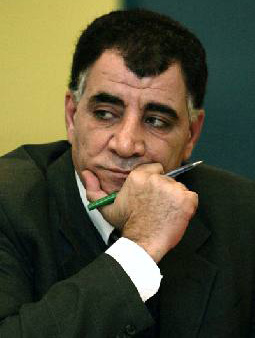
- Jamal Naji in 2006
- Born: Jamal Naji Mohammad Esmail; 1 November 1954; Aqbat Jaber, West Bank, annexed by Jordan
- Died: 6 May 2018 (aged 63); Amman, Jordan
- Writing career
- Genres: Novels, short stories
- Notable works: 'The Road to Balharith', 'Time', 'When Wolves Get Old', 'The Aftermath of the Recents whirlwinds', 'The Feathers Night'

Jamal Naji (Arabic: جمال ناجي), (1 November 1954 – 6 May 2018) was a Jordanian author of Palestinian origins. He was born in 1954 in the refugee camp of Aqbat Jaber in the West Bank, annexed by Jordan. He moved to Jordan in 1967, when he was in his early teens.

Naji began writing in his early twenties, and published his first novel The Road to Balharith in 1981–82. Since then he had written more novels as well as short story collections and television scripts. His novel When the Wolves Grow Old was shortlisted for the Arabic Booker Prize in 2010.

He was the president of the Jordanian Writers Association from 2001 to 2003. He lived and worked in Amman, Jordan.
