= History of Jordan =

The history of Jordan refers to the history of the Hashemite Kingdom of Jordan and the background period of the Emirate of Transjordan under the British Mandate as well as the general history of the region of Transjordan.

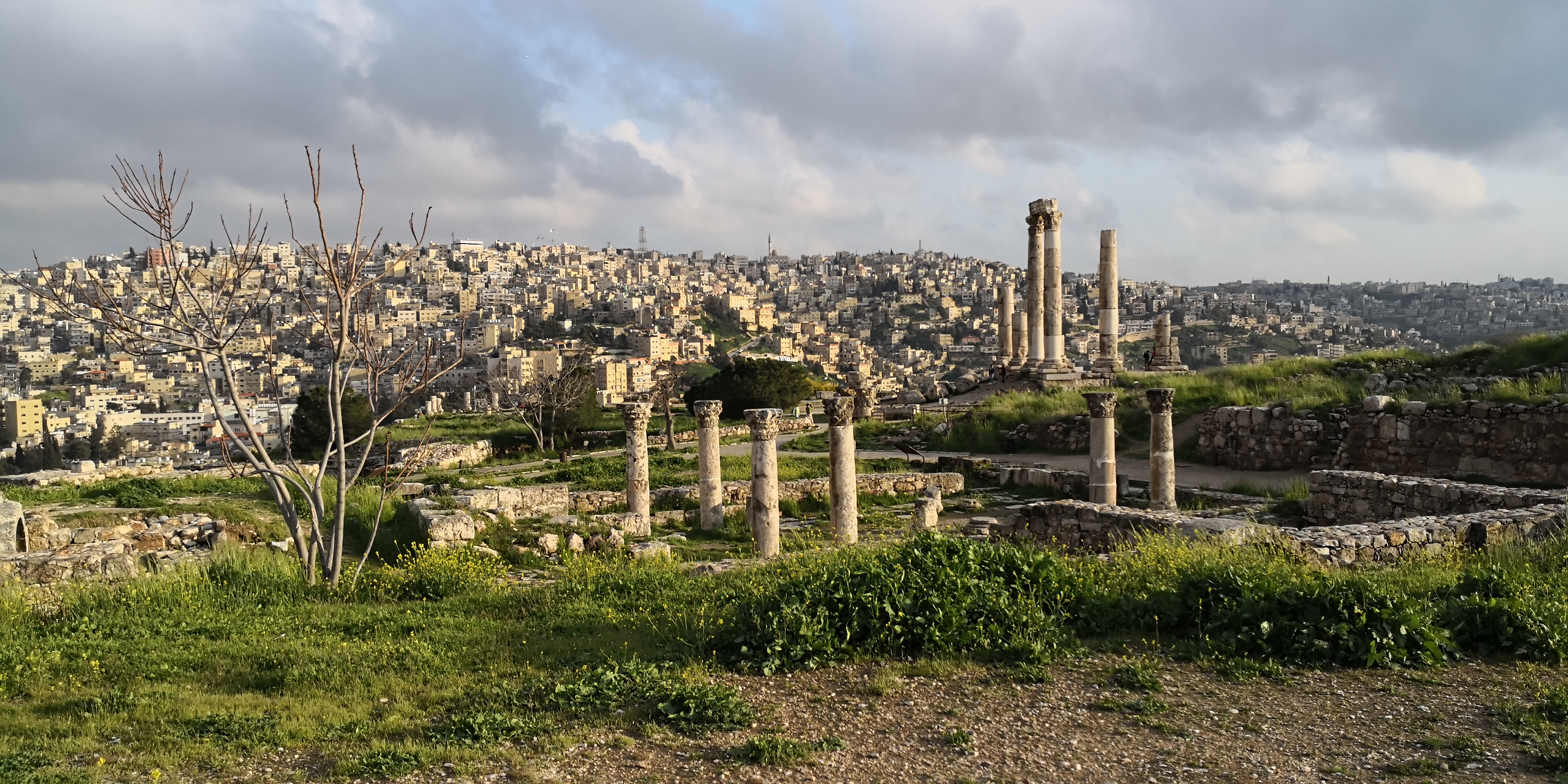
Amman Citadel

There is evidence of human activity in Transjordan as early as the Paleolithic period. The area was settled by nomadic tribes in the Bronze Age, which consolidated in small kingdoms during the Iron Age. In the classic period, Transjordan came under Greek and later Roman influence. Under the Romans and the Byzantines, Transjordan was home to the Decapolis in the north, with much of the region being designated as Byzantine Arabia. Classical kingdoms located in the region of Transjordan, such as the Roman-era Nabatean kingdom, which had its capital at Petra, left dramatic ruins popular today with tourists and filmmakers. The history of Transjordan continued with the Muslim empires starting in the 7th century, partial crusader control in the mid-Middle Ages (country of Oultrejordain) and finally, Mamluk rule from the 13th century and Ottoman rule between the 16th century and the First World War.

With the Great Arab Revolt in 1916 and the consequent British invasion, the area came under the Anglo-Arab ruled Occupied Enemy Territory Administration in 1917, which was declared as the Arab Kingdom of Syria in 1920. Following the French occupation of only the northern part of the Syrian Kingdom, Transjordan was left in a period of interregnum. A few months later, Abdullah, the second son of Sharif Hussein, arrived in Transjordan. With the Transjordan memorandum to the Mandate for Palestine in the early 1920s, it became the Emirate of Transjordan under the Hashemite Emir. In 1946, independent Hashemite Kingdom of Transjordan was formed and admitted to the United Nations in 1955 and the Arab League. In 1948, Jordan fought with the newly born state of Israel over lands of former Mandatory Palestine, effectively gaining control of the West Bank and annexing it with its Palestinian population. Jordan lost the West Bank in the 1967 War with Israel, and since became the central base of the Palestine Liberation Organization (PLO) in its struggle against Israel. The alliance between the PLO and the Jordanians, active during the War of Attrition, came to an end in the bloody Black September in Jordan in 1970, when a civil war between Jordanians and Palestinians (with Syrian Ba'athist support) took thousands of lives. In the aftermath, the defeated PLO was forced out of Jordan together with tens of thousands of its fighters and their Palestinian families, relocating to South Lebanon.

== Stone Age ==
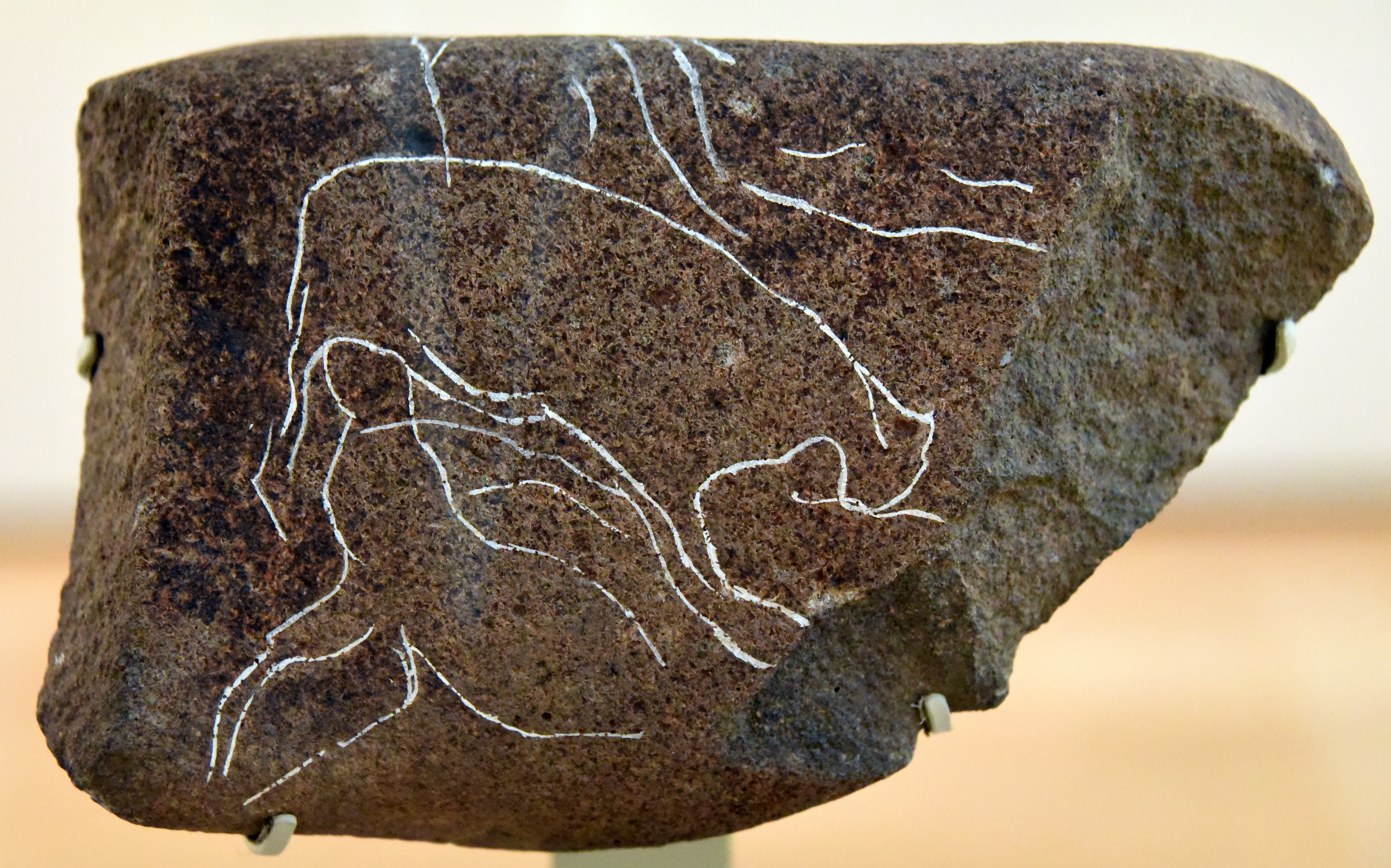
This basalt stone is incised with a scene showing two animals, probably gazelles. From Dhuweila, eastern Jordan, c. 6200 BCE. British Museum

Evidence of human activity in Jordan dates back to the Paleolithic period. While there is no architectural evidence from this era, archaeologists have found tools, such as flint and basalt hand-axes, knives and scraping implements.

In the Neolithic period (8500–4500 BC) three major shifts occurred. First, people became sedentary, living in small villages, and discovering and domesticating new food sources such as cereal grains, peas and lentils, as well as goats. The human population increased to tens of thousands.

Second, this shift in settlement pattern appears to have been catalyzed by a marked change in climate. The eastern desert, in particular, grew warmer and drier, eventually to the point where it became uninhabitable for most of the year. This watershed climate change is believed to have occurred between 6500 and 5500 BC.

Third, beginning sometime between 5500 and 4500 BC, the inhabitants began to make pottery from clay rather than plaster. Pottery-making technologies were probably introduced to the area by craftsmen from Mesopotamia.

The largest Neolithic site in Jordan is at Ayn Ghazal in Amman. The many buildings were divided into three distinct districts. Houses were rectangular and had several rooms, some with plastered floors. Archaeologists have unearthed skulls covered with plaster and with bitumen in the eye sockets at sites throughout Jordan, Israel, the Palestinian Territories and Syria. A statue discovered at Ayn Ghazal is thought to be 8,000 years old. Just over one meter high, it depicts a woman with huge eyes, skinny arms, knobby knees and a detailed rendering of her toes.

== Chalcolithic ==
During the Chalcolithic period (4500–3200 BC), copper began to be smelted and used to make axes, arrowheads and hooks. The cultivation of barley, dates, olives and lentils, and the domestication of sheep and goats, rather than hunting, predominated. The lifestyle in the desert was probably very similar to that of modern Bedouins.

Tuleitat Ghassul is a large Chalcolithic era village located in the Jordan Valley. The walls of its houses were made of sun-dried mud bricks; its roofs of wood, reeds and mud. Some had stone foundations, and many had large central courtyards. The walls are often painted with bright images of masked men, stars, and geometric motifs, which may have been connected to religious beliefs.

== Bronze Age ==
Many of the villages built during the Early Bronze Age (3200–1950 BC) included simple water infrastructures, as well as defensive fortifications probably designed to protect against raids by neighboring nomadic tribes.

At Bab al-Dhra in Wadi `Araba, archaeologists discovered more than 20,000 shaft tombs with multiple chambers as well as houses of mud-brick containing human bones, pots, jewelry and weapons. Hundreds of dolmens scattered throughout the mountains have been dated to the late Chalcolithic and Early Bronze Ages.

Although writing was developed before 3000 BC in Egypt and Mesopotamia, it was not widely used in Jordan, Canaan and Syria until some thousand years later, even though archaeological evidence indicates that the inhabitants of Transjordan were trading with Egypt and Mesopotamia.

Between 2300 and 1950 BC, many of the large, fortified hilltop towns were abandoned in favor of either small, unfortified villages or a pastoral lifestyle. There is no consensus on what caused this shift, though it is thought to have been a combination of climatic and political changes that brought an end to the city-state network.

During the Middle Bronze Age (1950–1550 BC), migration across the Middle East increased. Trading continued to develop between Egypt, Syria, Arabia, and Canaan including Transjordan, resulting in the spread of technology and other hallmarks of civilization. Bronze, forged from copper and tin, enabled the production of more durable axes, knives, and other tools and weapons. Large, distinct communities seem to have arisen in northern and central Jordan, while the south was populated by a nomadic, Bedouin-type of people known as the Shasu.

New fortifications appeared at sites like Amman's Citadel, Irbid, and Tabaqat Fahl (or Pella). Towns were surrounded by ramparts made of earth embankments, and the slopes were covered in hard plaster, making the climb slippery and difficult. Pella was enclosed by massive walls and watch towers.

Archaeologists usually date the end of the Middle Bronze Age to about 1550 BC, when the Hyksos were driven out of Egypt during the 17th and 18th Dynasties. A number of Middle Bronze Age towns in Canaan including Transjordan were destroyed during this time.

== Iron Age ==
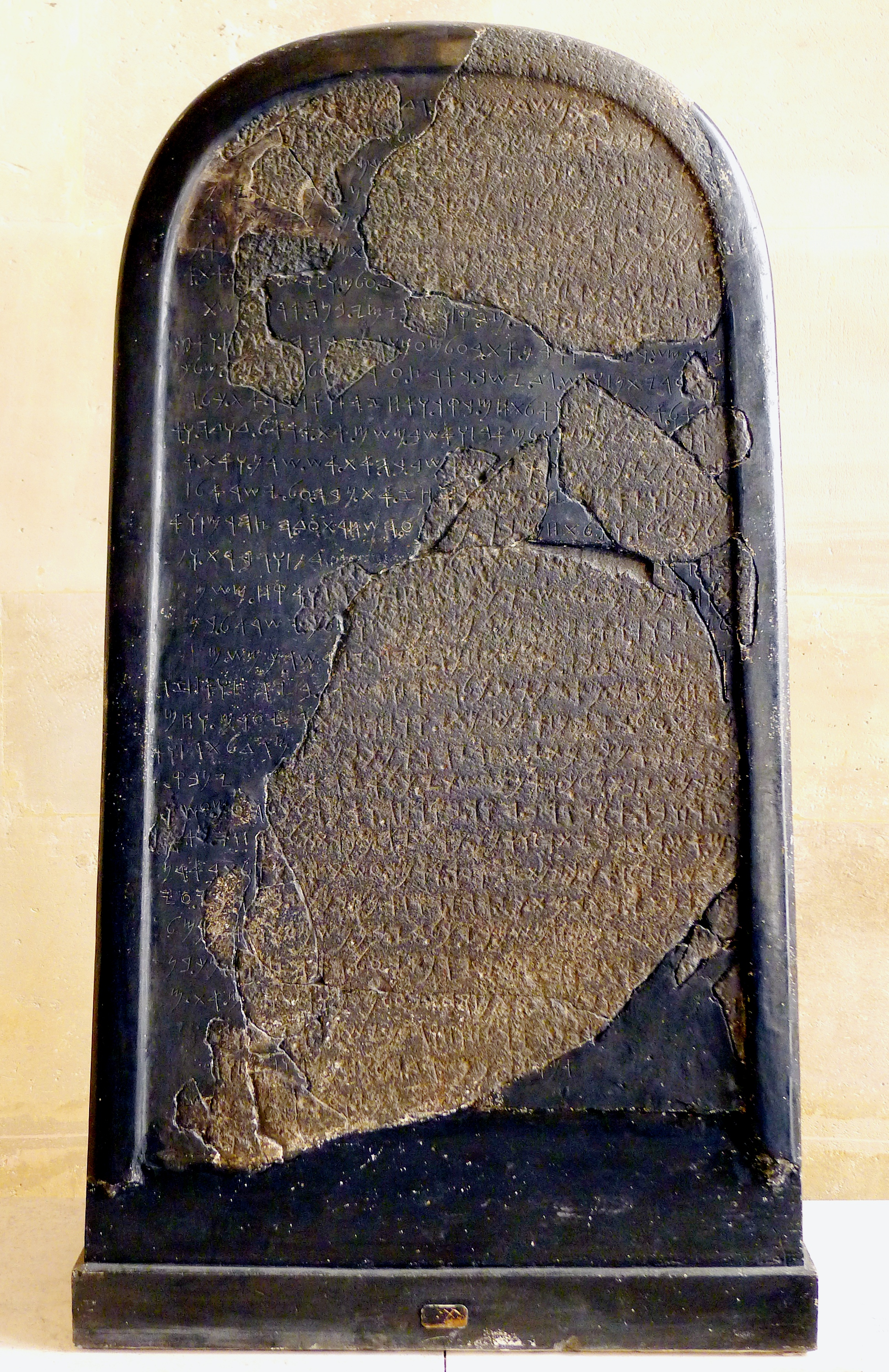
The Mesha Stele (c. 840 BCE), a royal Moabite inscription commemorating the victory of Moab over the Kingdom of Israel.

During the Iron Age (1200–332 BC), Transjordan was home to the Kingdoms of Ammon, Edom and Moab. The peoples of these kingdoms spoke Semitic languages of the Canaanite group; their polities are considered to be tribal kingdoms rather than states. Ammon was located in the Amman plateau, and its capital was Rabbath Ammon; Moab was located in the highlands east of the Dead Sea with the capital at Kir of Moab (Kerak); and Edom in the area around Wadi Araba in the south, with the capital at Bozrah. The northwestern region of the Transjordan, known then as Gilead, was inhabited by the Israelites. According to the Bible, the Transjordan was home to the Israelite tribes of Reuben, Gad, and the half-tribe of Manasseh.

The Transjordanian kingdoms of Ammon, Edom and Moab continually clashed with the neighboring Hebrew kingdoms of Israel and Judah, centered west of the Jordan River. One record of this is the Mesha Stele, erected by the Moabite king Mesha in 840 BC; on it he lauds himself for the building projects that he initiated in Moab and commemorates his glory and victory against the Israelites. The stele, found in Dhiban in 1868, constitutes one of the most important archeological parallels of accounts recorded in the Bible.

At the same time, Israel and the Kingdom of Aram-Damascus competed for control of the Gilead. Around 720 BC Israel and Aram Damascus were conquered by the Neo-Assyrian Empire. Meanwhile, the kingdoms of Ammon, Edom and Moab benefited from trade between Syria and Arabia. In 701 BC, they submitted to the Assyrians to avoid retribution. Babylonians took over the Assyrians' empire after its disintegration in 627 BC. Although the kingdoms supported the Babylonians against Judah in the 597 BC sack of Jerusalem, they rebelled against Babylon a decade later. The kingdoms were reduced to vassals, a status they retained under the Persian and Hellenic Empires.

== Classical period ==
Alexander the Great's conquest of the Persian Empire in 332 BC introduced Hellenistic culture to the Middle East. Little is known about Greek/Macedonian control over the Levantine coast (southern Syria, Lebanon, Palestine) and Transjordan until 301 BCE, when the Ptolemies took control over this area. After Alexander's death in 323 BC, the empire split among his generals, and in the end much of Transjordan was disputed between the Ptolemies based in Egypt and the Seleucids based in Syria. By the late Hellenistic period, the area had a mixed population of Jews, Greeks, Nabataeans, other Arabs, and descendants of Ammonites. One of the best surviving structures from that period is Qasr al-Abd, a Hellenistic palace built by the Jewish Tobiad family, close to the village of Iraq al-Amir.

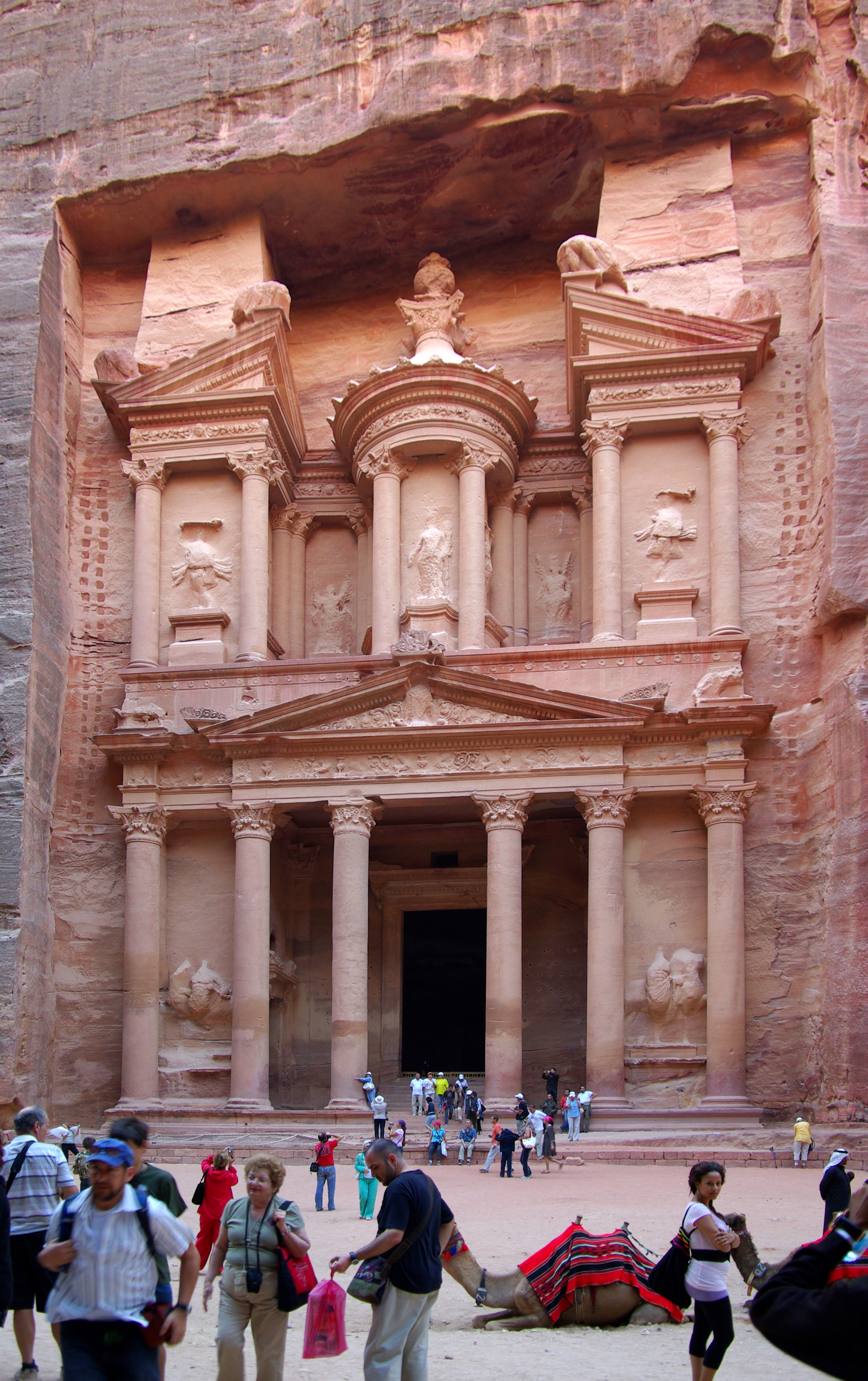
Petra, the capital of the Nabatean kingdom, is where the Nabatean alphabet was developed, from which the current Arabic alphabet further evolved.

The Nabataeans, nomadic Arabs based south of Edom, managed to establish an independent kingdom in the southern parts of Jordan in 169 BC by exploiting the struggle between the two Greek powers. The Jewish Hasmonean Kingdom also took advantage of the growing geopolitical vacuum, seizing the area east of the Jordan River valley. The Nabataean Kingdom gradually expanded to control much of the trade routes of the region, and it stretched south along the Red Sea coast into the Hejaz desert, up to as far north as Damascus, which it controlled for a short period (85–71) BC. The Nabataeans massed a fortune from their control of the trade routes, often drawing the envy of their neighbours. They also had monopolistic control over the Dead Sea. Petra, Nabataea's barren capital, flourished in the 1st century AD, driven by its extensive water irrigation systems and agriculture. The Nabataeans were also talented stone carvers, building their most elaborate structure, Al-Khazneh, in the first century AD. It is believed to be the mausoleum of the Arab Nabataean King Aretas IV.

Roman legions under Pompey conquered much of the Levant in 63 BC, inaugurating a period of Roman rule that lasted four centuries. The eastern side of the Jordan River valley, known then as Perea, was part of the Herodian Kingdom of Judea, a vassal state of the Roman Empire. By this time, the kingdoms of Ammon, Edom and Moab lost their distinct identities, and were assimilated into the Roman culture. Some Edomites survived longer - driven by the Nabataeans due to sedition, they had migrated to southern Judea, which became known as Idumaea; They were later converted to Judaism by the Hasmoneans. However, it is likely that Edomite migration to southern Judea has an older history, dating back to Nebuchadnezzar II's reign.

The area also became the setting for some important events in Christianity, including the Baptism of Jesus. In 106 AD, Emperor Trajan annexed the Nabataean Kingdom unopposed, and rebuilt the King's Highway which became known as the Via Traiana Nova road. The Romans gave the Greek cities of Transjordan–Philadelphia (Amman), Gerasa (Jerash), Gedara (Umm Quays), Pella (Tabaqat Fahl) and Arbila (Irbid)–and other Hellenistic cities in Palestine and southern Syria, a level of autonomy by forming the Decapolis, a ten-city league. Jerash is one of the best preserved Roman cities in the East; it was even visited by Emperor Hadrian during his journey to Syria Palaestina.

In 324 AD, the Roman Empire split, and the Eastern Roman Empire–later known as the Byzantine Empire–continued to control or influence the region until 636 AD. Christianity had become legal within the empire in 313 AD after Emperor Constantine converted to Christianity. The Edict of Thessalonka made Christianity the official state religion in 380 AD. Transjordan prospered during the Byzantine era, and Christian churches were built everywhere. The Aqaba Church in Ayla was built during this era, it is considered to be the world's first purpose built Christian church. Umm ar-Rasas in southern Amman contains at least 16 Byzantine churches. Meanwhile, Petra's importance declined as sea trade routes emerged, and after a 363 earthquake destroyed many structures, it declined further, eventually being abandoned. The Sassanian Empire in the east became the Byzantines' rivals, and frequent confrontations sometimes led to the Sassanids controlling some parts of the region, including Transjordan.

== Middle Ages ==
In the early 7th century, the area of modern Jordan became integrated into the new Arab-Islamic Umayyad Empire (the first Muslim dynasty), which ruled much of the Middle East from 661 until 750 AD. At the time, Amman, today the capital of the Kingdom of Jordan, became a major town in "Jund Dimashq" (the military district of Damascus, itself a subsection of the Bilad al-Sham province), and became the seat of the provincial governor. Incidentally, there was also a "Jund al-Urdunn" ("Realm of Jordan") district, but that encompassed a more northerly area than modern Jordan.

Under the Umayyad's successors, the Abbasids (750–1258), Jordan was neglected and began to languish due to the geopolitical shift that occurred when the Abbasids moved their capital from Damascus to Kufa and later to Baghdad.

After the decline of the Abbasids, parts of Jordan were ruled by various powers and empires including the Crusaders, the Ayyubids, the Mamluks as well as the Ottomans, who captured most of the Arab world around 1517.

== Ottoman period ==
=== Early Ottoman period ===
The Levant, which has been under Mamluk control since 1250 and specifically the Burji dynasty since 1382, was lost to the Ottomans after their victory in the Battle of Marj Dabiq that ended with the killing of the ruling Qansuh al-Ghuri in August 1516. Initially, the Ottomans didn't interfere much east of the Jordan river, but the increased trade activity passing through Jordan and their new responsibilities towards the Hajj soon caused the establishment of a Government in Al-Karak and a Garrison in Al Shobak. Agricultural villages in Jordan witnessed a period of relative prosperity in the 16th century, benefiting from the stability and administrative structures the Ottomans brought. The region saw tribes vie for regional hegemony, as in contrast to other regions such as Palestine or Damascus, the Jordanian territory would have less Ottoman oversight, and at times virtually absent and reduced to annual tax collection visits. This allowed the tribes in the area to have much more autonomy. The Ottoman period would see the power players inside Jordan which were the Bani Amr-Banu Oqbah, the Mihaydat, and Al-Fadl, be replaced roughly by Al-Majali, Al-Fayez-Bani Sakher, and the Adwan respectively.

=== Arrival of the Bani Sakher and the Adwan ===
Around the end of the 16th century, a portion of the ancient tribes of Bani Sakher and of the Suwiet clan of the Bani Dhafir, both descendants of Tayy, were heading northwards, with the Sakherites migrating from their ancestral home of Al Ula and the Dhafirites leaving also from an area close to Medina. The Bani Sakher have up until then been roaming the areas from south of Al Ula to as far north as the Golan Heights, and as far East as Fayum in Egypt since at least the Early Mamluk age, but the migration that was about to occur was more permanent and significant in nature. Enmity between the two migrating tribes would soon begin as they collided in battle in Southern Jordan which resulted in a decisive victory for the Bani Sakher. The Dhafir's would flee to Al Azraq where the Bani Sakher tracked them and battle with them again, decimating their forces and killing their Sheikh, Sultan Al-Suwiet. After this defeat, the tribe would split into two, one continued eastwards into Iraq, and the other remained in Jordan, going westwards and become the ancestors of the Adwan tribe. The Bani Sakher also collided with the Wuld Ali Anazzah on the way who migrated northwards at the same time, the battle ended with a Bani Sakher victory and would set the stage for further enmities between the two tribes later in the 18th century.

=== Al-Majali of Al-Karak ===
Around the year 1565, the Tamimi tribe, well established in Al-Karak at the time, raised a rebellion which proved too costly to send a regular force to quench. Lala Mustafa Pasha, Wali of Damascus at the time, asked for Yusuf Al-Nimer of Nablus's aide. Al-Nimer marched on Al-Karak with his forces and captured Al-Karak, fleeing the Tamimi to their relatives in Hebron, the Al-Tamimi who left Al-Karak were now nicknamed Al-Majali and it became their family name. He left behind some of the forces with one of his brothers, who held the area until a Turkish Ottoman governor arrived. The following period would see Al-Karak have a balanced power balance between the Turks, the Aghawat (the descendants of Yusuf's brother who remained), and the Emiri Banu Oqbah tribe of Banu Harb that held power in Al-Karak since the Mamluk age. 60 years later, after the death of Omar Agha Al-Nimr, Jalal Ibn Shadid Al-Majali went back to Al-Karak.

=== Struggle for the Hauran and Ahl Al-Shamal confederacy ===
The Hauran, a region extending from northern Suwayda to Northeast Al Mafraq in Jordan, alongside the Wadi Al-Azraq, commonly named as Wadi Al-Sirhan after the tribe, were some of the most coveted fertile grazing lands for Arab tribes up until the modern era. The Sirhan tribe, was the paramount tribe in both regions and lead a confederacy called Ahl Al-Shamal (people of the north) which included other tribes like the Al Issa and the Al Fheili. The neighboring tribe of Sardiya, led by Muhammed Al-Mheidi, attacked the Sirhan tribe near Damascus and killing their sheikh Shafi Al Sirhan circa 1650. The Sardiya would claim the Hauran and the Wadi as their own and would rule the region very strictly. The Al Issa and the Al Fheili deserted and would ally with the new lords, leading the Sirhan to migrate to the Al-Jawf region and not counterattack.

=== Anazah Invasion and Bani Sakher wars ===
The end of the 17th century saw the Wuld Ali tribe of the Anazah confederation, led by their paramount sheikhs Al-Tayyar and Ibn Smeir, began migrating deeper northwards out of Khaybar and into the Jawf region, which the Sirhan now inhabited. The Anazeh intended on violent conquest and would siege the Sirhan in the Jawf, reportedly causing a mass starvation for the tribe. At the time the Bani Sakher the two halves of the Bani Sakher, headed by the Al-Fayez and the Khreisha, would regularly camp in the Beersheba and Gaza districts respectively. A Bani Sakher tribesmen left the sieged area and informed the Sheikh Sulayman Al-Khreisha of the Bani Sakher who was camped in the Gaza, as I'dbeys Al-Fayez was involved with a conflict with the Emir of Beersheba at the time that led to the Emir's death. Al-Khreisha rode from Gaza to the Jawf, gathering the Bani Sakher forces on the way, and broke the Anazah siege on the Sirhan. However the Anazah kept pursuing the two tribes and led the tribes to flee to the northwards. This pushed the Bani Sakher, with their new allies the Sirhan, further north into Jordan and into Sardiya territory. The Bani Sakher and the Anazzah would however maintain political ties, especially in raiding such as the Hajj Caravan raids of 1700 and 1703.

Around the year 1720, a ploy set up by Sheikh I'dbeys Al-Fayez and Sheikh Sulayman Al Khreisha of the Bani Sakher succeeded against the Mahfuz (chief) of the Sardiya. This event would see the Bani Sakher's number of horsemen rise greatly, and would permanently damage the prestige of the Sardiya. The Al-Fayez were soon bestowed as commanders of the Hajj Caravans as the most capable tribe in defending them. In one of the following years, the Anazah battled the Sardiya in Muyzarib, a village northeast of Irbid, and would kill their Sheikh and end the Ahl Al Shamal Confederacy. After which the Bani Sakher, Sirhan, Sardiya, Al Issa, Al Fheili, and some minor tribes would take refuge in Palestine, while the tribes that remained agreed to a Khawa or a tax to be paid to their new Anazah overlords. Al Fheili would permanently settle in Palestinian cities as land tillers and gave up their Bedouin status. For the majority of the rest of the century, the Anazah would rule large swathes of modern-day eastern Jordan, from the Hauran to the Jawf, and occasionally the Balqa region and its surrounding regions.

The Bani Sakher, having lost many of its lands in the east, would set their attention to their western lands in the Balqa and Al-Karak and would even get involved in Palestinian power struggles and politics for the rest of the 18th century. In 1730 they challenged Adwan dominance in the Balqa and were established enough in the Balqa to not pay to graze on Adwani lands. In the 1750s they extended their influence deeper into Al-Karak and imposed Khawa on many tribes of Al-Karak including the Tarawna, Dhmur, Atawna, Sarayra, Nawaysa, Maayta, Habashna, and the Christians of Al-Karak. Both of these expansions were under I'dbeys Al-Fayez's, which began a rivalry between the Bani Sakher and the Majali to their south and the Bani Sakher and the Adwan to their north.

In 1757, owing to a missed payment by the Ottomans to the Bani Sakher for their help in the siege of Tiberias and a drought in the previous year, Qa'dan, I'dbeys's brother and successor, attacked the advance guard of the Hajj caravan under the Ottoman command Musa Pasha in Al-Qatranah. Husayn Pasha had also been alerted of the advance guard's plunder and the relief guard's dispersal, and attempted to reach out to Sheikh Qa'dan. The Wali of Damascus Husayn Pasha sent representatives who offered Sheikh Qa'dan to negotiate for safe passage to Damascus but were refused. This led to the Hajj Caravan Raid of 1757 which had reverberating effects across the entire Ottoman Empire and greatly affected the Empire's prestige.

=== Adwan rise to power ===
Around 1640, the dynamics of power within the Belqa District began to shift dramatically with the arrival of two brothers, Fayez and Fauzan of the Al Dhafir tribe, who sought refuge with the Al Kinda tribe near Jebel Samik. The death of Fauzan shortly after their arrival left Fayez to integrate into the local tribal hierarchy through a pivotal marriage to the daughter of the Sheikh of Kinda. This union bore a son named Adwan, who would later forge an alliance through marriage with a daughter of the Mihdawiya sheikhs, thereby knitting together significant tribal relations that would lay the groundwork for future confrontations and territorial expansions.

Adwan's son, Hamdan, became a notable figure in these tribal narratives, distinguishing himself through a successful raid on a caravan traveling from northern Iraq to Mecca. The raid, which occurred as the caravan crossed the stream at Al Zarqa, not only bolstered Hamdan's reputation but also resulted in the acquisition of a she-camel named "Al Zabta," a prize that would become a war cry for the Adwan. Over time, Hamdan's ambition and growing discontent with his master, Jaudat, the Mihdawiya Emir, drove him to secretly amass a loyal group of followers known as the Al Qradha, or "The Borrowed." This group proved pivotal in Hamdan's strategies, remaining loyal throughout the ensuing turbulent periods.

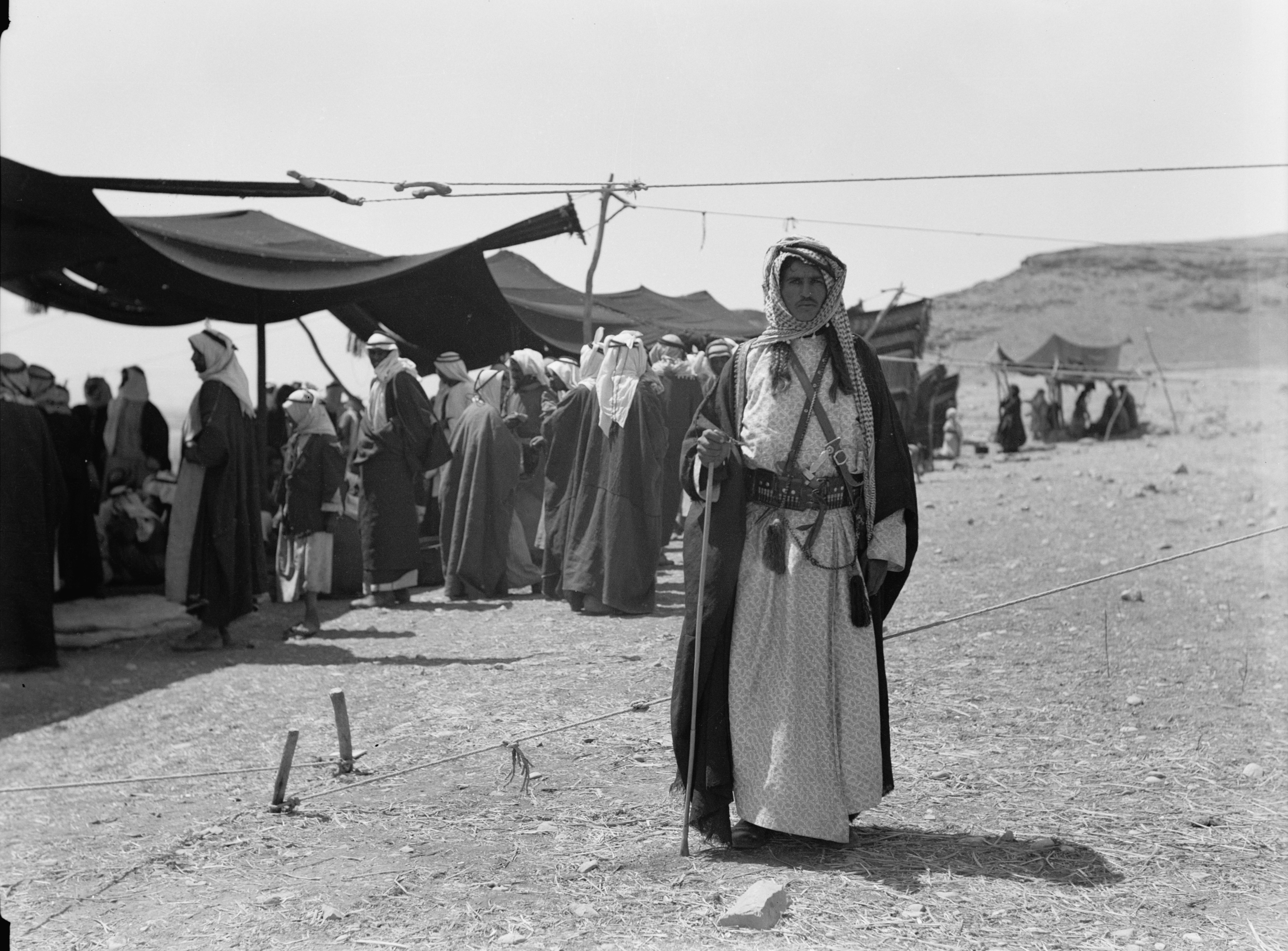
Majid Sultan Al Adwan at Shunet Nimrin, Paramount Sheikh of the Adwan in the early 20th century, and the great-great-great-great-grandson of Salih ibn Adwan.

The tension between Hamdan and Jaudat escalated to a breaking point when Jaudat's oppressive demands led to a revolt, sparked by an incident where a tribesman was forced to substitute for an ox in plowing fields. This revolt, smoldering over two decades, eventually led to Hamdan's death. His sons, however, continued the struggle, leveraging the Mihdawiya Amir's controversial attempt to forcibly marry the daughter of a Christian priest from Al Fheis. This situation presented an opportunity for the Adwan to strategically intervene by allying with the Al Ajarmah tribe and setting a trap for Jaudat under the guise of a reconciliatory wedding feast in Al Fheis. The resulting ambush was deadly; Jaudat and several of his men were killed, a pivotal moment still commemorated by Al Mihdawi's tree in the village.

In the aftermath, Jaudat's son, Dhamman, unable to maintain control, retreated with his followers to the Ghors al-Kafrain, Al Rameh, and Al Shunnet Nimrin, effectively ceding significant upland territories to the Adwan. Adwan bin Hamdan who succeeded his father capitalized on this retreat by pursuing Dhaman's son, Mashhur, to the modern Dharset Mashhur, where Mashhur was killed. The victory allowed Adwan to consolidate control over the Ghor, distributing the newly acquired lands among his sons and relatives, at the cost of Dhamman who took refuge at the Balawna tribe. His eldest son, Kayid, received the comparatively smaller Ghor al-Rameh and was encouraged to further expand territory by challenging Dhamman and the Balawna.

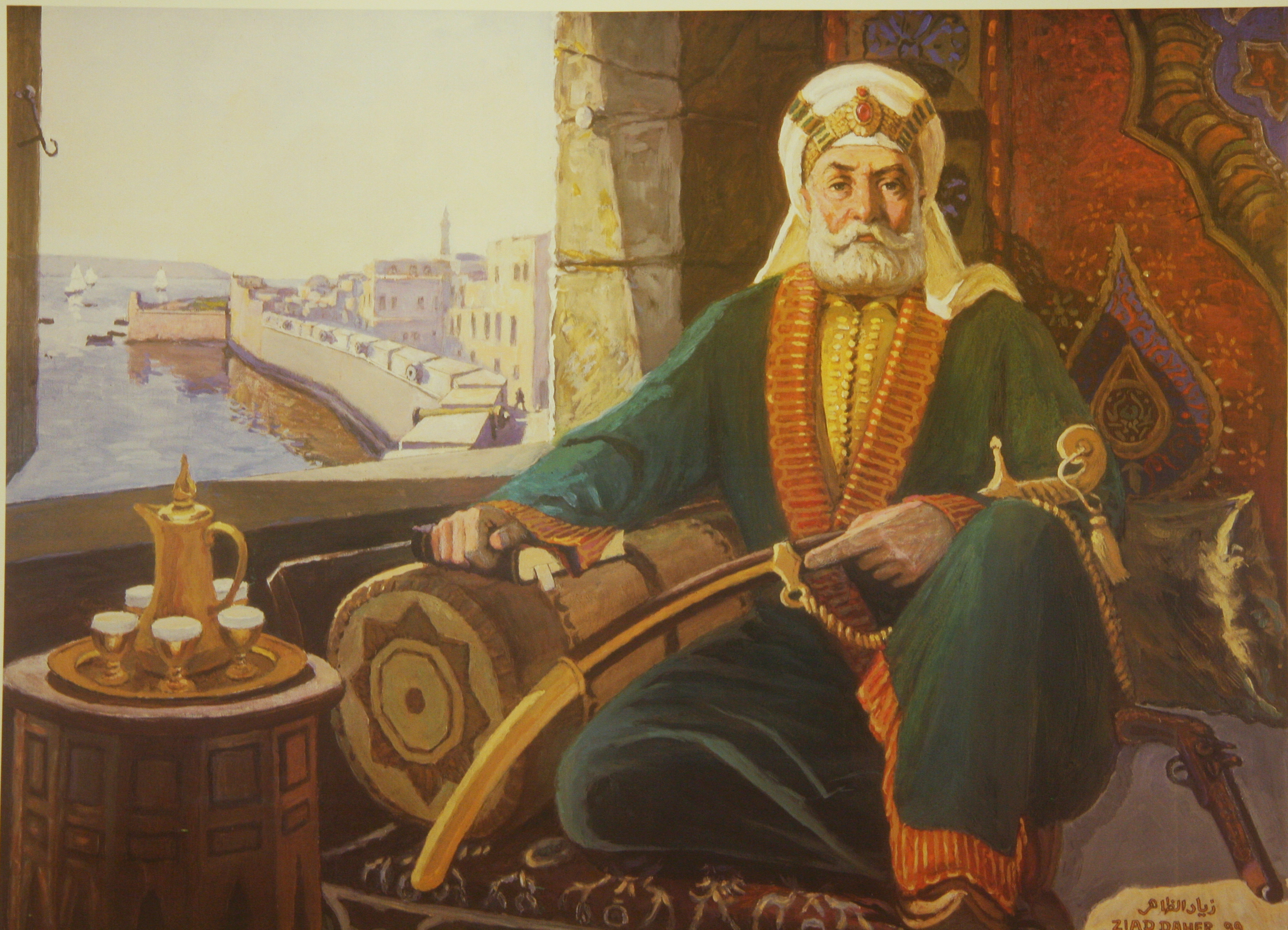
Zahir Al Umar, who during his reign fought both the Bani Sakher and the Adwan

The battle that followed, taking place at the banks of the Zarqa stream, was costly; Kayid was mortally wounded, and significant losses were suffered. Despite these setbacks, the Adwan, reinforced by their allies, the Qradha, advanced again, decisively defeating the Balawna and driving the Mihdawiya further north, beyond Beisan and into the Ajlun District. This series of conflicts not only solidified Adwan control over the Belqa but also marked the decline of the Mihdawiya as a regional power by 1750, now under Kayid's brother, Diyab.

Hostilities soon arose between the Al-Adwan and Zahir Al Omar, the latter sent a force under Qasim Al-Said to attack Al-Adwan and successfully captured Al-Salt in 1760, and leading the Diyab and his followers to flee to Al-Karak. Salih, Diyab's brother, remained on his lands and would stage a successful raid on a caravan loaded with weapons sent from Nablus to Al-Said. Al-Said turned his attention to Salih but was defeated at Al Ghor, with Salih seizing the chieftainship of the Adwan and the Balqa from Diyab. A succession crisis followed, with Diyab's failed attempt at battling his brother, he asked for Turkish help which led Salih to stay inside Al Salt. Salih failed to recognize the contempt that the urbanites of Al Salt had for the Adwan and was captured and executed, with his head sent to the Turks as a gift. Diyab regained his position momentarily until another revolt caused his death and the Adwan to flee to Jabal Al Druze for half a year, coming back under the leadership of the famous poet Nimr Al-Adwan.

=== Majali rise to power in Al-Karak ===
Upon Jalal's arrival, Al-Karak was dominated by two influential factions: the Imamiya, descendants of Turkish officials, and the Amr, who traced their lineage back to Banu Oqbah of Harb, a participant in the historic defeat at Mu'tah in 629. The Majali remained relatively obscure until Salim, Jalal's grandson, rose to prominence as the Chief of the tribe. Salim was instrumental in leveraging the internal strife between the Imamiya and the Amr. Around the year 1700, Salim, sensing an opportunity, allied with the Amr to confront the Imamiya during a large feast at the Bairam festival. An ambush was organized near the west gate of Al-Karak; the signal for attack—a white flag—was raised if the feast included an ox, indicating the presence of numerous Imamiya leaders. When this signal was confirmed, Salim and his 25 men launched a decisive attack, annihilating the Imamiya's presence in Al-Karak.

The leadership of Al-Karak then passed to Muhammed Ibn Salim, and then to Hamad, who engaged

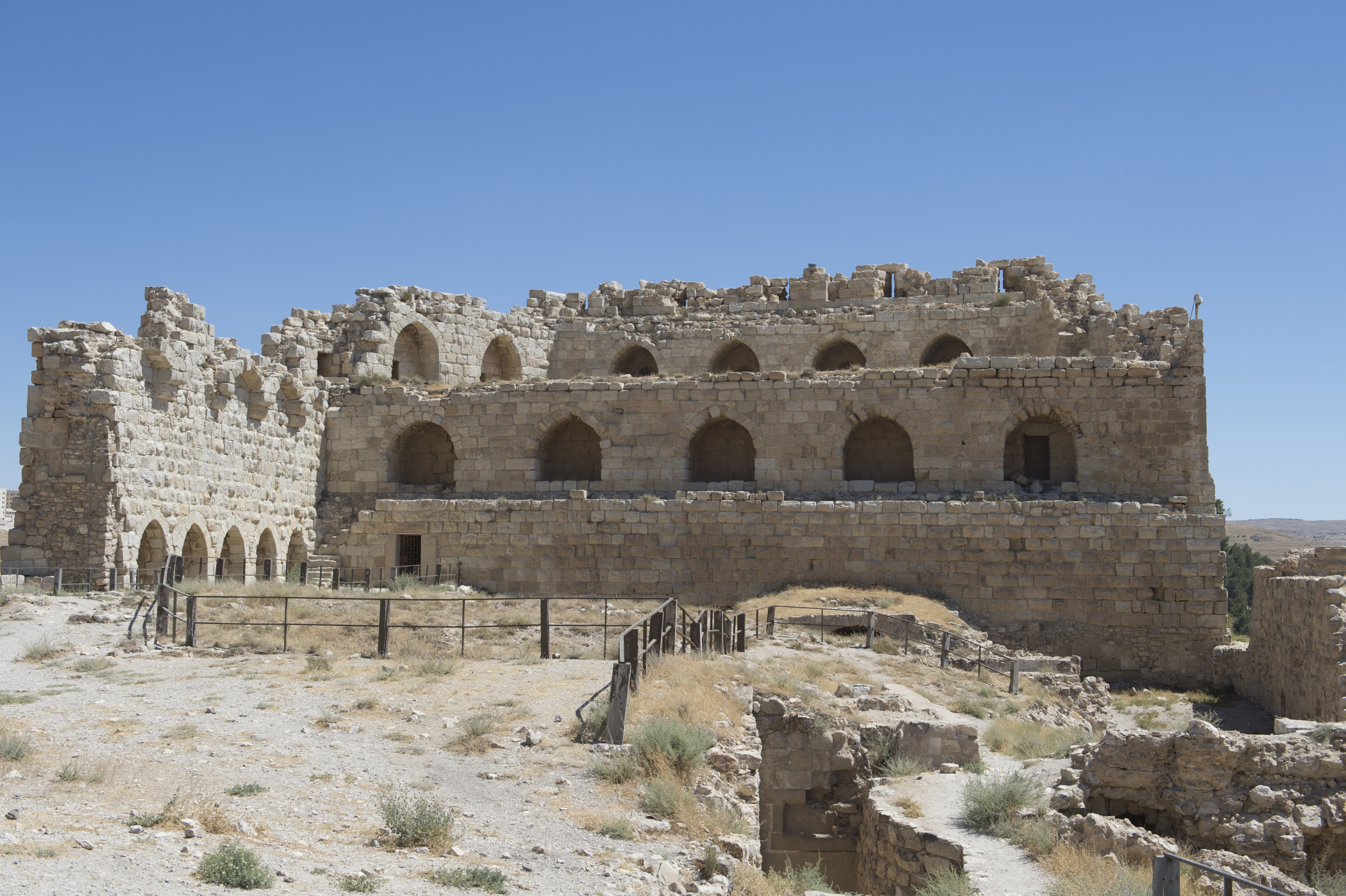
The Kerak Castle, used by the Majalis for centuries

the Amr over land disputes near Mezar. Using traditional boundary-setting techniques, Hamad managed to expand Majali territory significantly, a crucial step in securing the tribe's future prosperity. Salim ibn Muhammed succeeded his brother Hamad and sought the support of neighboring tribes such as the Bani Hamida, the Hajaya, and the Bani Sakhr, with which Salim successfully expelled the Amr from Al-Karak. However, the victory was bittersweet as the allied tribes demanded their share of the spoils, leading to continued strife and tributes imposed on various groups within the region, with the Bani Sakher levying khawa on most of the tribes in Al-Karak.

Khalil Majali, succeeding Salim around 1760. The Majali's dominance was challenged during a severe famine of 1779 when Khalil, who controlled the local grain supplies planned to leverage the famine to acquire land from desperate locals. However, his plans were disrupted when Salim's grandson Yusef ibn Sulayman Majali, responding to the community's urgent needs, led a grain caravan from Jerusalem back to Al-Karak. Despite attempts by Khalil to intercept and rob the caravan, Yusef's diplomatic skills ensured its safe passage, which earned him great favor with the local Al-Karaki people.

Khalil's death soon after marked another pivotal moment for the Majali. Yusef, who was very popular in Al-Karak was elected head of the tribe. He invited the Amr back to Al-Karak in 1804 to strategically incite conflict with the Bani Hamida, ultimately leading to the Amr's expulsion once again. Yusef then incited the Al-Karaki's to attack the Bani Hamida, blaming them for the misfortunes and wars of the region. After a successful attack, Yusef seized the fertile lands north of Al-Karak for himself, securing Majali power and riches in Al Al-Karak.

=== Al-Fayez Period ===
The Beni Sakher under Awad bin Thiab Al-Fayez reinstated the Ahl Al-Shamal confederacy at the beginning of the 19th century with Al Sirhan, Al Sardiya, and the Al Issa as junior tribes, and would raid the Wuld Ali Anazah from Palestine and the Balwa for many decades, until their gradual weakening, ending with the Bani Sakher regaining their lands to the east. The Wuld Ali Anazah were finally pushed out and northwards into Al Mafraq. Around that time, in 1803 the Wahhabi's began occupying lands in Southern Jordan, until they reached Al-Karak in 1808. The Karakis, under Yusuf Al-Majali, refused to pay the Wahhabis, which might've been the reason for Ibn Sa'ud conferring on title of "Emir of all the Bedouins to the south of Damascus, as far as the Red Sea." on Yusuf. This title would prove to be short-lived as by 1812 the Bani Sakher were so overwhelming that they defeated the joint-forces of the Adwan, the Wali of Damascus Sulayman Pasha, and the newly arrived but powerful Ruwalla tribe to occupy and seize the Balqa and flee the Adwan to Ajloun where Al Freihat and Al Schreideh were the paramount powers. A power struggle between Al Freihat and al Schreideh allowed the Bani Sakher to extend further into Jabal Ajloun. In the same year, Johann L. Burckhardt would become the first westerner to see the ancient city of Petra in over a thousand years. In 1820, a battle took place between the Bani Sakher, now led by a young Fendi Al-Fayez and the Adwan led by Diyab and their allies the Bani Hassan north of the Balqa where "much blood was spilt".

In 1822, Syria was ceded to Ismail Pasha and the growing Muhammad Ali dynasty in Egypt, however rule of the tribes still remained lax and more powerful tribes would see the say autonomy during this period. In 1825, the Al-Freihat and their allies sided with the Adwan and their Balqa coalition which included a list of tribes in Al Qradha and the Bani Hassan, successfully pushed the Bani Sakher out of Jabal Ajloun. In 1833 Ibrahim Pasha turned on the Ottomans and established his rule, whose oppressive policies led to the unsuccessful Peasants' revolt in Palestine in 1834. Jordanian cities of Al-Salt and Al-Karak were destroyed by Ibrahim Pasha's forces for harboring a fled Palestinian revolt leader. Egyptian rule was forcibly ended in 1841 with the help of western intervention, the Ottoman rule was restored. The middle of the 18th century so the rapid expansion

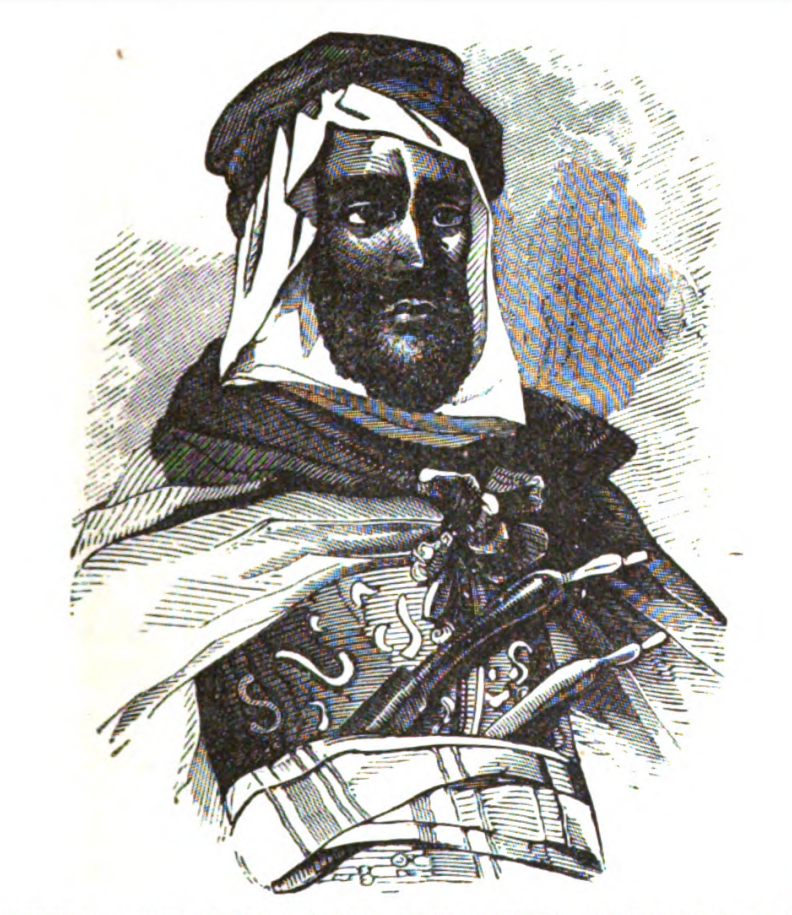
Prince Fendi Al-Fayez in the 1870s

of the Bani Sakher, under now Emir Fendi Al-Fayez who has seemingly overshadowed his Khreisha counterpart and would gain effective control of the whole tribe. In 1848, an expedition by American Naval Officer William Lynch had him encounter the Bani Sakher during negotiations with Aqil Agha. Already by then, Lynch, noted that the tribe at this point was the most powerful force east of the Jordan, and that Fendi Al-Fayez was referred to as prince, and his son and successor Sattam as the young prince. Around this time Fendi would send Sattam as an emissary to Muhammad Ali Pasha of Egypt bearing horses for gifts.

During that period, the tribe succeeded in establishing vassalage over a significant number of tribes and villages across Jordan, including Al Sardiya, Al Sirhan, Bani Abbad, Bani Hamida, and notably, the influential Majali. The vassalizing of Al-Karak and the Majalis under the sway of Al-Fayez was notably documented in 1863 by Italian explorer Carlo Guarmani.

A pivotal event in these power dynamics involved the Majalli family, detailed in Carlo Guarmani's account in his book, Northern Nejd. The villagers of Al Tafilah, traditionally under the jurisdiction of Mohammad Al-Majalli and accustomed to paying annual tributes, expressed dissatisfaction with the Majalis' dwindling protection. Led by Abdullah Al-Huara, chief of Al Tafilah, they collectively decided to renounce their vassal status, proposing instead to offer yearly gifts as a token of homage. This shift did not sit well with the Al-Majalli chief, who intended to reassert control. However, intervention by the Bani Sakher, under the leadership of Fendi, whose diplomatic efforts led to a compromise that averted immediate conflict.

The tension resurfaced in January 1864 when Al-Majalli sought to reclaim authority over Tafilah. This move triggered a formal declaration of war from Fendi. Shlash Al-Bakhit Al-Fayez led a successful tactical assault against Qoblan Al-Mkheisen, appointed by Al-Majalli to manage Tafilah. In response, Fendi deployed 200 warriors who faced a formidable opposition of 2000 riflemen mounted on dromedaries. As the standoff prolonged, the people of Al-Kerak found themselves in an effective state of siege, grappling with food shortages and growing discontent. In a strategic move, Al-Majalli covertly approached Fendi under the cover of night to formally concede defeat, agreeing to make amends to those affected by the hostilities, including reinstating Al-Huara's son as the Chief of Al-Tafilah. This resolution solidified Al-Fayez's influential role in mediating and resolving tribal conflicts, further instated their leadership and diplomatic prowess in the region.

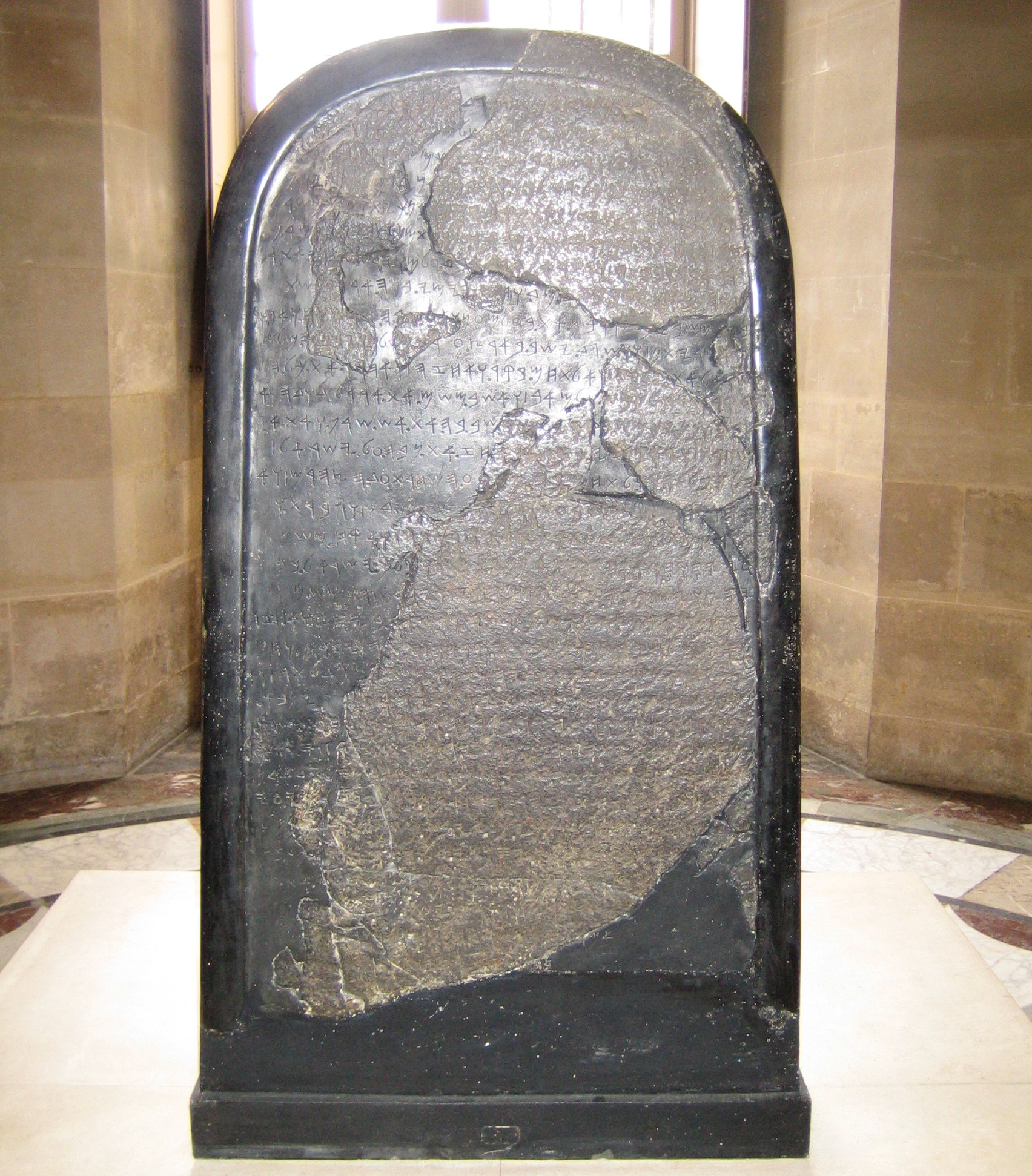
The Moabite Stone, first revealed to the western world by Sattam bin Fendi

Around the late 1860s Fendi began sharing many of his responsibilities with his son Sattam, who would become the first tribal Sheikh in Jordan since the early Mamluk age to focus on administration, agriculture, and state-building in Jordan outside the urban centers of Al Salt and Al Karak. A formal alliance was struck between the Bani Sakher and the Adwan since the beginning of their hostilities in the 1620s, with the marriage of Alia, the sister of Ali ibn Diyab Al Adwan, to Sattam. Henry Tristram's expedition to the area was right after this marriage, and he was guided by Sheikh Sattam Al-Fayez around much of the country in a 3-month journey, showing signs of much greater stability than what was the case in the previous centuries. Al-Fayez would introduce Henry to the Moabite stone which was in the vassal Bani Hamida lands. The stone was a great discovery, and after strained negotiations it was finally sent to Paris where it now resides in the Louvre.

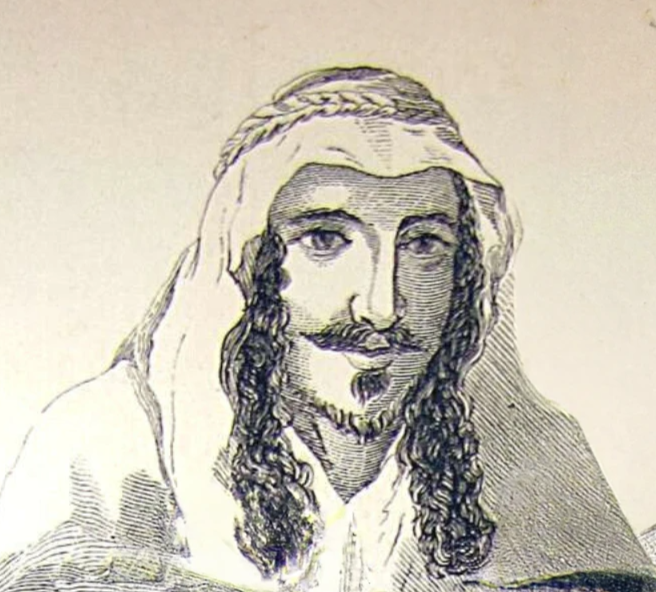
A young Emir Sattam bin Fendi in 1848

The alliance between the Bani Sakher and the Adwan posed a threat to the Ottoman administration, preceding the Great Arab Revolt by half a century. The mid-1860s would see the Ottomans send multiple forces under Mehmet Rashid Pasha in 1867 into the Adwan lands. The Ottomans instated Mohammad Sa'id Agha as the governor of the Balqa which greatly affected Adwan prestige. Another force was sent against the Adwan who were supported by the Adwan, culminating in another defeat and forcing the Adwan to pay 225,000 piasters as a fine. Another force sent by Rashid Pasha into the Bani Sakher lands in 1869 but the area was too costly to maintain for the Ottomans due to the frequency of attacks.

Russian persecution of Sunni Muslim Circassians in Circassia, forced their immigration into the region in 1867, where they today form a small part of the country's ethnic fabric. Oppression and neglect for the people of the region forced the population to decline, the only people left were nomadic Bedouins. Urban settlements with small populations included; Al-Salt, Irbid, Jerash and Al-Karak. What added to the under-development of the urban life in Jordan was the fact that the settlements were raided by the Bedouins as a source of living, the urbanites had to pay them to stay

safe.

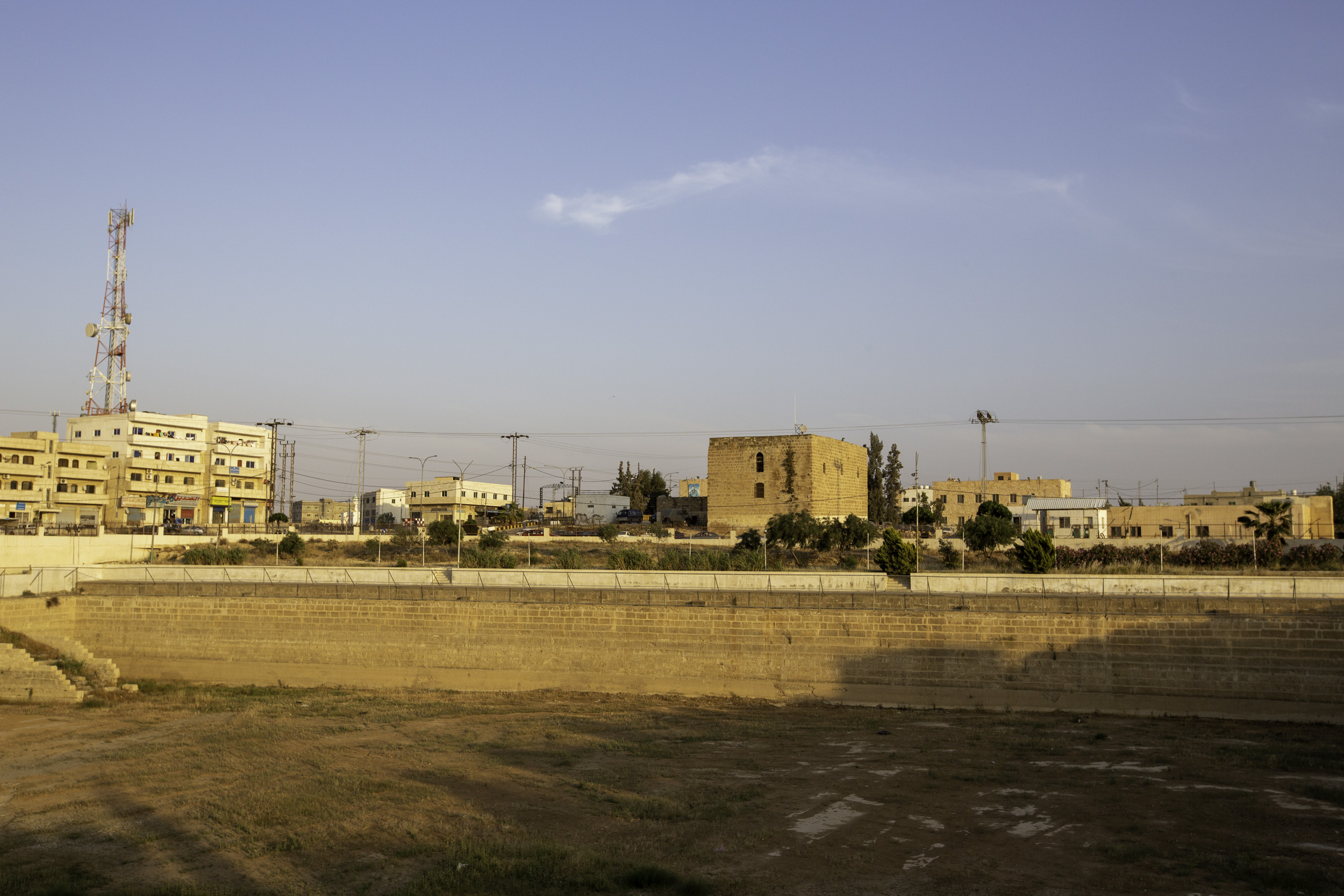
The Al-Jizah reservoir, dating back to the Pax Romana, and the Mamluk building which was refitted by the Ottoman for Sattam to govern from.

The Circassians, supported by the Ottomans, were resettled in Amman, which was a huge loss to the prestige and riches of Adwan. In a balancing act the Ottomans then resettled the Christians of Al Karak which have been paying tribute to the Al-Fayez since 1750 in Madaba, the stronghold of Al-Fayez. This greatly angered Sheikh Sattam who was by now the effectively the paramount Sheikh of the Bani Sakher. Sattam first protested, and with the Ottoman's firm resolution, resorted to violence in order to drive them out. Instead of a prolonged battle, the Ottomans appeased the young Emir by officially giving him the office of Emir Al Jizah, which included the titles Bey and Agha.

=== Late Ottoman Period ===
Ottoman oppression provoked a revolt, Most notably the Shoubak revolt and the Karak revolt, they were only suppressed with great difficulty.

== Emirate of Transjordan ==
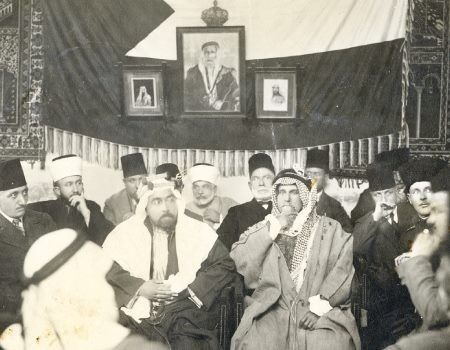
First election in Transjordan's history on 2 April 1929.

After four centuries of stagnant and many times nominal Ottoman rule (1516–1918), Turkish control over Transjordan came to an end during World War I when the Hashemite Army of the Great Arab Revolt, took over and secured present-day Jordan with the help and support of the region's local Bedouin tribes, Circassians, and Christians. The revolt was launched by the Hashemites and led by Sharif Hussein of Mecca against the Ottoman Empire. The revolt was supported by the Allies of World War I, including Britain and France. Sharif Hussein's sons, Faisal and Abdullah, were promised territorial rule in return.

With the break-up of the Ottoman Empire at the end of World War I, the League of Nations and the occupying powers, Britain and France, redrew the borders of the Middle East. Their decisions, most notably the Sykes–Picot Agreement, led to the establishment of the French Mandate for Syria and British Mandate for Palestine. The latter included the territory of Transjordan, which had been already allocated to Abdullah approximately a year prior to the finalization of the Mandate document (the Mandate officially introduced in 1923).

One reason was that the British government had at that point to find a role for Abdullah, after his brother Faisal had lost his control in Syria. Jordan had been a "staging area" for Faisal's and the Arab nationalists' attempted takeover of Syria in 1918, which was ultimately defeated by the French. Following this, Transjordan was left in a period of interregnum. A few months later, Abdullah, the second son of Sharif Hussein, arrived into Transjordan. Faisal was subsequently given the role of the king of Iraq and the British made Abdullah emir of the newly created Transjordanian state. At first, Abdullah was displeased with the territory given to him, and hoped it was only a temporary allocation, to be replaced by Syria or Palestine. Historian Joseph Massad has described the founding of Jordan as a state in 1921 as "a hesitant act by its architects, the British and the Hashemites."

The Permanent Court of International Justice and an International Court of Arbitration established by the Council of the League of Nations handed down rulings in 1925 which determined that Palestine and Transjordan were newly created successor states of the Ottoman Empire as defined by international law.

The most serious threats to Emir Abdullah's position in Transjordan were repeated Wahhabi incursions from Najd into southern parts of his territory. The emir was powerless to repel those raids by himself, thus the British maintained a military base, with a small air force, at Marka, close to Amman.

In 1928, Britain officially provided King Abdullah with full autonomy, though the British RAF continued to provide security to the emirate.

The Emirate of Transjordan had a population of 200,000 in 1920, 225,000 in 1922 and 400,000 (as Kingdom) in 1948. Almost half of the population in 1922 (around 103,000) was nomadic.

== Kingdom of Transjordan/Jordan ==
=== Establishment ===
On 17 January 1946 the British Foreign Secretary, Ernest Bevin, announced in a speech at the General Assembly of the United Nations that the British Government intended to take steps in the near future to establish Transjordan as a fully independent and sovereign state. The Treaty of London was signed by the British Government and the Emir of Transjordan on 22 March 1946 as a mechanism to recognise the full independence of Transjordan upon ratification by both countries' parliaments. Transjordan's impending independence was recognized on April 18, 1946, by the League of Nations during the last meeting of that organization. On 25 May 1946 the Transjordan became the "Hashemite Kingdom of Transjordan" when the ruling 'Amir' was re-designated as 'King' by the parliament of Transjordan on the day it ratified the Treaty of London. 25 May is still celebrated as independence day in Jordan although legally the mandate for Transjordan ended on 17 June 1946 when, in accordance with the Treaty of London, the ratifications were exchanged in Amman and Transjordan gained full independence. When King Abdullah applied for membership in the newly formed United Nations, his request was vetoed by the Soviet Union, citing that the nation was not "fully independent" of British control. This resulted in another treaty in March 1948 with Britain in which all restrictions on sovereignty were removed. Despite this, Jordan was not a full member of the United Nations until December 14, 1955.

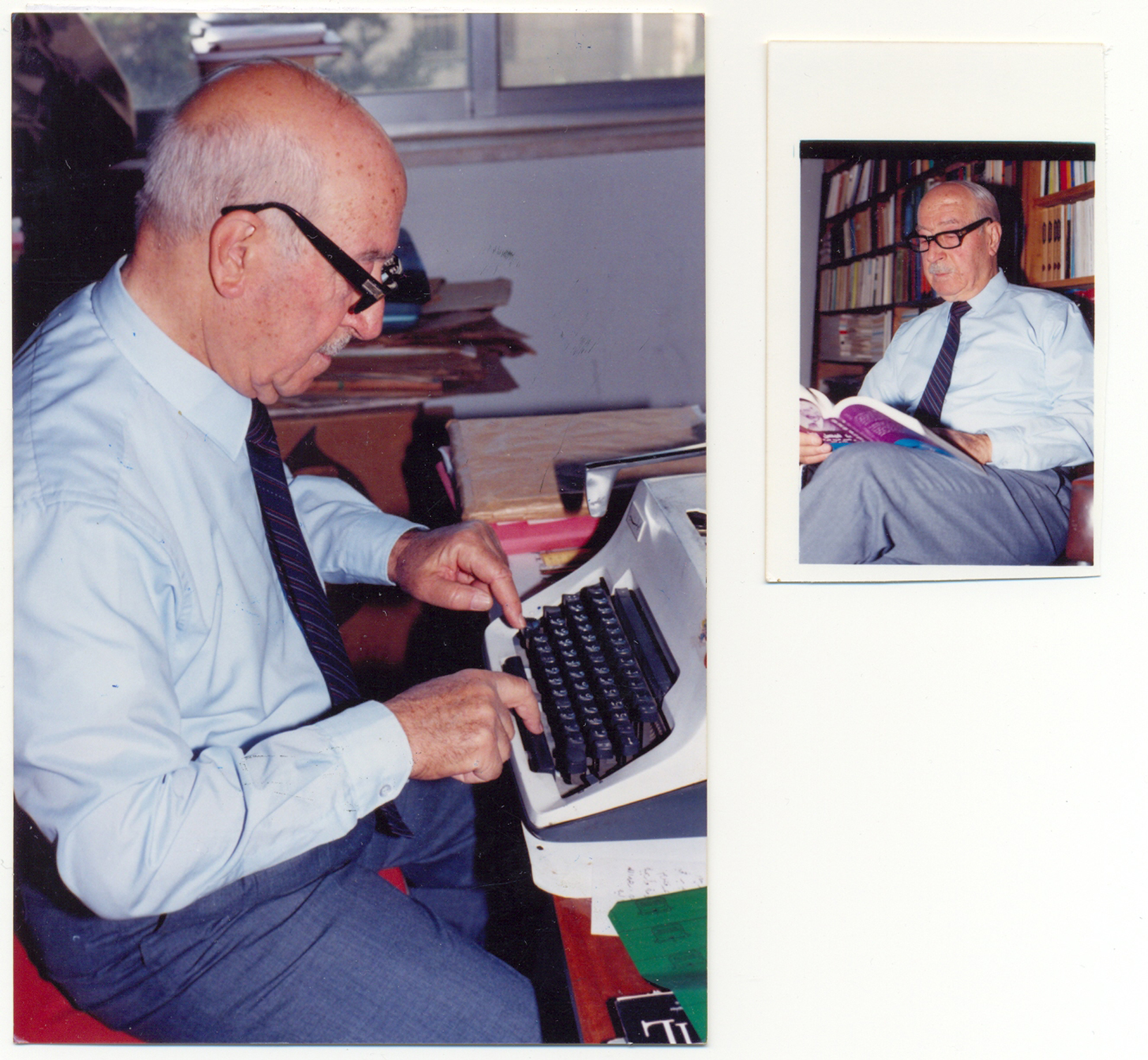
Suleiman Mousa, who did groundbreaking work on the modern history of Jordan and the Arab Revolt.

In April 1949, after the country gained control of the West Bank, the country's official name became the "Hashemite Kingdom of Jordan".

=== 1948 War and annexation of the West Bank ===
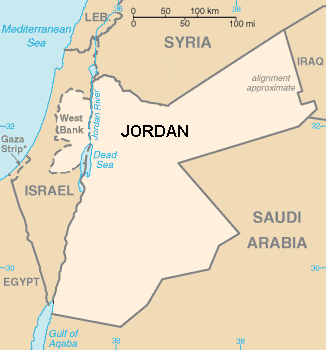
Jordan 1948–1967. The East Bank is the portion east of the Jordan river, the West Bank is the part west of the river

Transjordan was one of the Arab states opposed to the partition of Palestine and creation of Israel in May 1948. It participated in the war between the Arab states and the newly founded State of Israel. Thousands of Palestinians fled the Arab-Israeli fighting to the West Bank and Jordan. The Armistice Agreements of 3 April 1949 left Jordan in control of the West Bank and provided that the armistice demarcation lines were without prejudice to future territorial settlements or boundary lines.

The United Nations General Assembly adopted a plan for the future government of Palestine which called for termination of the Mandate not later than 1 August 1948.

The works of Benny Morris, Avi Shlaim, Ilan Pappe, Mary Wilson, Eugene Rogan, and other historians outline a modus vivendi agreement between Abdullah and the Yishuv. Those works are taught in most Israeli university courses on the history, political science, and sociology of the region. Archival materials reveal that the parties had negotiated the non-belligerent partition of Palestine between themselves, and that initially they had agreed to abide by the terms of the UN resolution. John Baggot Glubb, the commander of the Arab Legion, wrote that British Foreign Secretary Bevin had given the green light for the Arab Legion to occupy the territory allocated to the Arab state. The Prime Minister of Transjordan explained that Abdullah had received hundreds of petitions from Palestinian notables requesting protection upon the withdrawal of the British forces. Eugene Rogan says that those petitions, from nearly every town and village in Palestine, are preserved in The Hashemite Documents: The Papers of Abdullah bin al-Husayn, volume V: Palestine 1948 (Amman 1995).

After the mandate was terminated, the armed forces of Transjordan entered Palestine. The Security Council adopted a US-backed resolution that inquired about the number and disposition of Transjordan's armed forces in Palestine. The Foreign Minister of Transjordan replied in a telegram "that neither the UN nor US recognized Transjordan, although they both had been given the opportunity for more than two years. Yet the US had recognized the Jewish state immediately, although the factors for this recognition were lacking."

In explaining to the Security Council why Transjordan's armed forces had entered Palestine, Abdullah said: "we were compelled to enter Palestine to protect unarmed Arabs against massacres similar to those of Deir Yassin."

After capturing the West Bank during the 1948 Arab–Israeli War, Abdullah was proclaimed King of Palestine by the Jericho Conference. The following year, Jordan annexed the West Bank.

The United States extended de jure recognition to the government of Transjordan and the government of Israel on the same day, 31 January 1949. Clea Bunch said that "President Truman crafted a balanced policy between Israel and its moderate Hashemite neighbours when he simultaneously extended formal recognition to the newly created state of Israel and the Kingdom of Transjordan. These two nations were inevitably linked in the President's mind as twin emergent states: one serving the needs of the refugee Jew, the other absorbing recently displaced Palestinian Arabs. In addition, Truman was aware of the private agreements that existed between Jewish Agency leaders and King Abdullah I of Jordan. Thus, it made perfect sense to Truman to favour both states with de jure recognition."

In 1978, the U.S. State Department published a memorandum of conversation between Mr. Stuart W. Rockwell of the Office of African and Near Eastern Affairs and Abdel Monem Rifai, a Counselor of the Jordan Legation, on 5 June 1950. Mr. Rifai asked when the United States was going to recognize the union of Arab Palestine and Jordan. Mr. Rockwell explained the Department's position, stating that it was not the custom of the United States to issue formal statements of recognition every time a foreign country changed its territorial area. The union of Arab Palestine and Jordan had been brought about as a result of the will of the people and the US accepted the fact that Jordanian sovereignty had been extended to the new area. Mr. Rifai said he had not realized this and that he was very pleased to learn that the US did in fact recognize the union.

Jordan was admitted as a member state of the United Nations on 14 December 1955.

On 24 April 1950, Jordan formally annexed the West Bank (including East Jerusalem) declaring "complete unity between the two sides of the Jordan and their union in one state... at whose head reigns King Abdullah Ibn al Hussain". All West Bank residents were granted Jordanian citizenship. The December 1948 Jericho Conference, a meeting of prominent Palestinian leaders and King Abdullah, voted in favor of annexation into what was then Transjordan.

Jordan's annexation was regarded as illegal and void by the Arab League and others. It was recognized by Britain, Iraq and Pakistan. The annexation of the West Bank more than doubled the population of Jordan. Both Irbid and Zarqa more than doubled their population from less than 10,000 each to more than, respectively, 23,000 and 28,000.

=== Reign of King Hussein ===
King Abdullah's eldest son, Talal of Jordan, was proclaimed king in 1951, but he was declared mentally unfit to rule and deposed in 1952. His son, Hussein Ibn Talal, became king on his eighteenth birthday, in 1953.

The 1950s have been labelled as a time of "Jordan's Experiment with Liberalism". Freedom of speech, freedom of the press, and freedom of association were guaranteed in the newly written constitution as with the already firmly established freedom of religion doctrine. Jordan had one of the freest and most liberal societies in the Middle East and in the greater Arab world during the 1950s and early 1960s.

Jordan ended its special defense treaty relationship with the United Kingdom and British troops completed their withdrawal in 1957. In February 1958, following announcement of the merger of Syria and Egypt into the United Arab Republic, Iraq and Jordan announced the Arab Federation of Iraq and Jordan, also known as the Arab Union. The Union was dissolved in August 1958.

Image showing the approximate land exchanged in 1965 between Jordan (gaining green) and Saudi Arabia (gaining red).

In 1965 Jordan and Saudi Arabia concluded a bilateral agreement that realigned the border. The realignment resulted in some exchange of territory, and Jordan's coastline on the Gulf of Aqaba was lengthened by about eighteen kilometers. The new boundary enabled Jordan to expand its port facilities and established a zone in which the two parties agreed to share petroleum revenues equally if oil were discovered. The agreement also protected the pasturage and watering rights of nomadic tribes inside the exchanged territories.

Video of developments regarding Jordan during 1980

Jordan signed a mutual defense pact in May 1967 with Egypt, and it participated, along with Syria, Egypt, and Iraq in the Six-Day War of June 1967 against Israel. During the war, Israel took control of East Jerusalem and West Bank, leading to another major influx of Palestinian refugees into Jordan. Its Palestinian refugee population—700,000 in 1966—grew by another 300,000 from the West Bank. The result of the 29 August 1967 Arab League summit was the Khartoum Resolution, which according to Abd al Azim Ramadan, left only one option -a war with Israel.

The period following the 1967 war saw an upsurge in the power and importance of Palestinian militants (fedayeen) in Jordan. Other Arab governments attempted to work out a peaceful solution, but by September 1970, known as the Black September in Jordan, continuing fedayeen actions in Jordan — including the destruction of three international airliners hijacked and held in the desert east of Amman — prompted the Jordanian government to take action. In the ensuing heavy fighting, a Syrian tank force took up positions in northern Jordan to support the fedayeen but was forced to retreat. By September 22, Arab foreign ministers meeting at Cairo had arranged a cease-fire beginning the following day. Sporadic violence continued, however, until Jordanian forces won a decisive victory over the fedayeen in July 1971, expelling them from the country.

An attempted military coup was thwarted in 1972. No fighting occurred along the 1967 cease-fire line during the Yom Kippur War in 1973, but Jordan sent a brigade to Syria to fight Israeli units on Syrian territory.

In 1974, King Hussein recognised the PLO as the sole legitimate representative of the Palestinian people. However, in 1986, Hussein severed political links with the PLO and ordered its main offices to be closed. In 1988, Jordan renounced all claims to the West Bank but retained an administrative role pending a final settlement. Hussein also publicly backed the Palestinian uprising, or First Intifada, against Israeli rule.

Jordan witnessed some of the most severe protests and social upheavals in its history during the 1980s. Protests in Jordanian universities especially Yarmouk University and urban areas protested inflation and lack of political freedom. A massive upheaval occurred in the southern city of Ma'an. There was rioting in several cities over price increases in 1989. The same year saw the first general election since 1967. It was contested only by independent candidates because of the ban on political parties in 1963. Martial law was lifted and a period of rapid political liberalization began. Parliament was restored and some thirty political parties, including the Islamic Action Front, were created.

Jordan did not participate directly in the Gulf War of 1990–91, but it broke with the Arab majority and supported the Iraqi position of Saddam Hussein. This position led to the temporary repeal of U.S. aid to Jordan. As a result, Jordan came under severe economic and diplomatic strain. After the Iraqi defeat in 1991, Jordan, along with Syria, Lebanon, and Palestinian representatives, agreed to participate in direct peace negotiations with Israel sponsored by the U.S. and Russia. Eventually, Jordan negotiated an end to hostilities with Israel and signed a declaration to that effect on July 25, 1994; the Israel-Jordan Peace Treaty was concluded on October 26, 1994, ending 46-year official state of war.

Food price riots occurred in 1996, after subsidies were removed under an economic plan supervised by the International Monetary Fund. By the late 1990s, Jordan's unemployment rate was almost 25%, while nearly 50% of those who were employed were on the government payroll. The 1997 parliamentary elections were boycotted by several parties, associations and leading figures.

In 1998, King Hussein was treated for lymphatic cancer in the United States. After six months of treatment he returned home to a rousing welcome in January 1999. Soon after, however, he had to fly back to the US for further treatment. King Hussein died in February 1999. More than 50 heads of state attended his funeral. His eldest son, Crown Prince Abdullah, succeeded to the throne.

=== Reign of King Abdullah II ===
==== Economy ====
Economic liberalization policies under King Abdullah II have helped to create one of the freest economies in the Middle East.

In March 2001, King Abdullah and presidents Bashar al-Assad of Syria and Hosni Mubarak of Egypt inaugurated a $300m (£207m) electricity line linking the grids of the three countries. In September 2002, Jordan and Israel agreed on a plan to pipe water from the Red Sea to the shrinking Dead Sea. The project, costing $800m, is the two nations' biggest joint venture to date. King Abdullah and Syrian President Bashar al-Assad launched the Wahdah Dam project at a ceremony on the Yarmuk River in February 2004.

==== Foreign relations ====
Jordan has sought to remain at peace with all of its neighbors. In September 2000, a military court sentenced six men to death for plotting attacks against Israeli and US targets. Following the outbreak of Israeli-Palestinian fighting in September 2000, Amman withdrew its ambassador to Israel for four years. In 2003, Jordan's Central Bank retracted an earlier decision to freeze accounts belonging to leaders of Hamas. When senior US diplomat Laurence Foley was gunned down outside his home in Amman in October 2002, in the first assassination of a Western diplomat in Jordan, scores of political activists were rounded up. Eight militants were later found guilty and executed in 2004. King Abdullah did, however, criticise the United States and Israel over the conflict in Lebanon in 2006.

==== Politics ====
Jordan's gradual institution of political and civil liberty has continued, but the slow pace of reform has led to increasing discontent. Following the death of a youth in custody, riots erupted in the southern town of Ma'an in January 2002, the worst public disturbances in more than three years.

The first parliamentary elections under King Abdullah II were held in June 2003. Independent candidates loyal to the king won two-thirds of the seats. A new cabinet was appointed in October 2003 following the resignation of Prime Minister Ali Abu al-Ragheb. Faisal al-Fayez was appointed prime minister. The king also appointed three female ministers. However, in April 2005, amid reports of the king's dissatisfaction with the slow pace of reforms, the government resigned and a new cabinet was sworn in, led by Prime Minister Adnan Badran.

The first local elections since 1999 were held in July 2007. The main opposition party, the Islamist Action Front, withdrew after accusing the government of vote-rigging. The parliamentary elections of November 2007 strengthened the position of tribal leaders and other pro-government candidates. Support for the opposition Islamic Action Front declined. Political moderate Nader Dahabi was appointed prime minister.

In November 2009, the King once more dissolved parliament halfway through its four-year term. The following month, he appointed a new premier to push through economic reform. A new electoral law was introduced May 2010, but pro-reform campaigners said it did little to make the system more representational. The parliamentary elections of November 2010 were boycotted by the opposition Islamic Action Front. Riots broke out after it was announced that pro-government candidates had won a sweeping victory.

==== Arab Spring ====
On 14 January, the Jordanian protests began in Jordan's capital Amman, and at Ma'an, Al Karak, Salt and Irbid, and other cities. The following month, King Abdullah appointed a new prime minister, former army general Marouf Bakhit, and charged him with quelling the protests whilst carrying out political reforms. The street protests continued through the summer, albeit on a smaller scale, prompting the King to replace Bakhit with Awn al-Khasawneh, a judge at the International Court of Justice (October 2011). However, Prime Minister Awn al-Khasawneh resigned abruptly after just six months having been unable to satisfy either the demands for reform or allay establishment fears of empowering the Islamist opposition. King Abdullah appointed former prime minister Fayez al-Tarawneh to succeed him.

In October 2012, King Abdullah called for early parliamentary elections, to be held at some time in 2013. The Islamic Action Front, continued in its calls for broader political representation and a more democratic parliament. The King appointed Abdullah Ensour, a former minister and vocal advocate of democratic reform, as prime minister.

Mass demonstrations took place in Amman (November 2012) against the lifting of fuel subsidies. Public calls for the end of the monarchy were heard. Clashes between protesters and supporters of the king followed. The government reversed the fuel price rise following the protest. Al Jazeera stated that protests are expected to continue for several weeks because of increasing food prices.

==== Arab Winter ====
With the rapid expansion of the Islamic State of Iraq and the Levant into northern and eastern Iraq in summer of 2014, Jordan became threatened by the radical Jihadist organization, and deployed more troops on the Iraqi and Syrian borders.

== See also ==
- Fayfa, archaeological site
- History of Asia
- History of the Middle East
- History of the Levant
- List of kings of Jordan
- Politics of Jordan
