= 2026 in Jordan =

- Decades: 2000s; 2010s; 2020s
- See also: Other events of 2026; Timeline of Jordanian history

Events in the year 2026 in Jordan.

== Incumbents ==
- Monarch – Abdullah II
- Prime Minister – Jafar Hassan

== Events ==
=== January ===
- 13 January – The United States designates the Jordanian chapter of the Muslim Brotherhood as a terrorist organization, citing its support for Hamas.

=== February ===
- 28 February – In retaliation for the 2026 Israeli–United States strikes on Iran, Iran launches missiles at surrounding countries, including Jordan.

=== March ===
- 9 March – Ukrainian president Volodymyr Zelenskyy confirms the deployment of interceptor drones and specialists to help protect U.S. military bases in Jordan amid the 2026 Iran war.

=== April ===
- 5 April – The Jordanian Armed Forces intercept two missiles and two drones from Iran.

=== June ===
- 11 June – The Jordanian Armed Forces intercept an Iranian missile attack on Azraq.
- 11 June–19 July – Jordan participates at the 2026 FIFA World Cup
- 23 June – One person is killed while eight others are injured in a crowd crush at a gathering to view a FIFA World Cup match in Amman.

=== July ===
- 21 July – The US announces a trade agreement with Jordan.
- 24 July – The United States imposes a 10% tariff on Jordan, citing the presence of alleged forced labour in the supply chain.
- 25 July – The Aqaba Marine Reserve is designated as a UNESCO World Heritage Site.

=== September ===
- 9 September – A Fairchild Republic A-10 Thunderbolt II and approximately eight F-15s are damaged in an Iranian strike on Muwaffaq Salti Air Base.
- 14 September – An ammonia gas leak at an industrial facility in Aqaba injures 14 people.
- 28 September — Israel announces that it prevented an attempt to transfer munitions from Jordan to Israel with a drone.

=== October ===
- 23 October — Nine people are killed in a gun attack inside a church in Hmoud, Karak Governorate.
- 26 October — Jordan declares that it struck militant hideouts in southern Syria in response to the Hmoud attack blamed on organizations operating there. However, Syria announces that eight people, including three children and an elderly man, were killed in the strikes. Syria later shuts the Nasib Border Crossing. Jordan claims that the strikes killed 20 Islamic State militants, but also admitted civilian casualties.
- 28 October — Jordan and Syria decide to form a joint investigative committee following the Jordanian strikes against Islamic State militants in Syria.
- 31 October — The Jordanian Armed Forces announces that it stopped 14 armed individuals who were trying to cross the northern border from Syria, adding that it had inflicted multiple casualties during a firefight.

=== November ===
- 5 November — A security officer is killed and another official is wounded in a stabbing in Amman. The assailant is immediately detained at the scene.
- 15 November – Three men who carried out the 2026 Karak church shooting that killed nine people are sentenced to death by hanging by the State Security Court.
- 16 November – Jordan prohibits Telegram due to national security concerns.
- 18 November – A Sikorsky UH-60 Black Hawk helicopter of the Royal Jordanian Air Force crashes in an undisclosed location, injuring the five occupants on board.

== Holidays ==
- 1 January – New Year's Day
- 20–23 March – Eid al-Fitr
- 5 April – Gregorian Easter
- 1 May – Labour Day
- 25 May – Independence Day
- 26-30 May – Eid al-Adha
- 16 June – Islamic New Year
- 25 August – The Prophet's Birthday
- 25 December – Christmas Day

== Deaths ==
- 2 January – Saleh Rusheidat, 80, member of the House of Representatives (since 1993).
- 3 January – Jamil Azar, 89, journalist and broadcaster, founder of Al Jazeera.
- 4 January – Ali Abu Al-Ragheb, 89, prime minister (2000–2003).
- 2 February – Ahmad Obeidat, 87, prime minister (1984–1985).
- 20 June – Sami al-Oraydi, Islamist militant, leader of Hurras al-Din (2018–2025).
