= 1994 in Israel =

- Decades: 1970s; 1980s; 1990s; 2000s; 2010s
- See also: History of Israel; Timeline of Israeli history; List of years in Israel

Events in the year 1994 in Israel.

== Incumbents ==
- President of Israel – Ezer Weizman
- Prime Minister of Israel – Yitzhak Rabin (Israeli Labor Party)
- President of the Supreme Court – Meir Shamgar
- Chief of General Staff – Ehud Barak
- Government of Israel – 25th Government of Israel

== Events ==
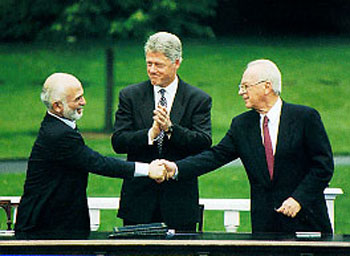
King Hussein, Bill Clinton and Yitzhak Rabin, during the signing of the Israel-Jordan peace treaty, October 26, 1994

- January 12 – Major General Nehemiah Tamari's helicopter crashed near Central Command headquarters, killing both him and three other officers.
- May 21 – Mustafa Dirani kidnapping: Israeli commandos kidnap Mustafa Dirani, an officer of the Lebanese Amal Shi'a militia. (see Ron Arad).
- July 25 – Israel and Jordan sign the Washington Declaration which formally ends the state of war that had existed between them since 1948.
- August 8 – The Wadi Araba Crossing opens, becoming the first border crossing between Israel and Jordan.
- October 26 – Israel and Jordan sign the Israel-Jordan Treaty of Peace, witnessed by US President Bill Clinton.

=== Israeli–Palestinian conflict ===
The most prominent events related to the Israeli–Palestinian conflict which occurred during 1994 include:

- February 25 – Cave of the Patriarchs/Ibrahimi Mosque massacre: American-Israeli ultra-Zionist Kahanist Baruch Goldstein opens fire inside the Cave of the Patriarchs, Hebron, in the West Bank; killing 29 and injuring 125 Palestinians in prayer. Goldstein is fatally beaten by the surviving Palestinians.
- May 4 – Israel and the PLO sign the Gaza–Jericho Agreement.
- May 18 – Israeli forces withdraw from Jericho and Gaza City in compliance with the Oslo accords.
- December 10 – Yitzhak Rabin, Shimon Peres and Yasser Arafat receive the Nobel Peace Prize.

Notable Palestinian militant operations against Israeli targets

The most prominent Palestinian militant acts and operations committed against Israeli targets during 1994 include:

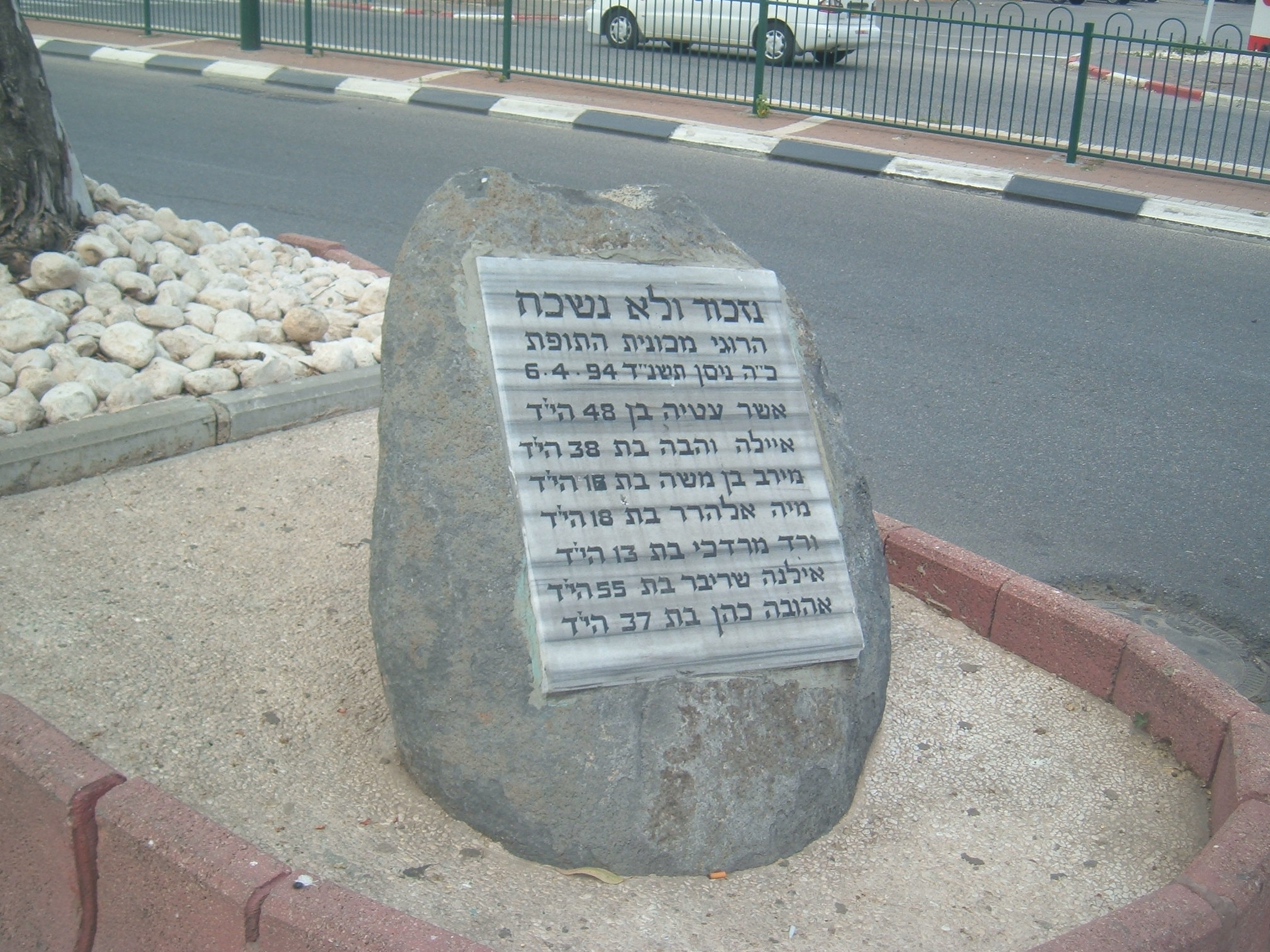
Memorial for the victims of the Afula Bus suicide bombing built at the site of the event

- April 6 – Afula Bus suicide bombing attack: Eight Israelis are killed by a Palestinian Arab suicide car bombing attack, in Afula.
- April 13 – Hadera central station suicide bombing attack: Five Israelis are killed and another 30 are wounded during a Palestinian Arab suicide attack on a public bus in Hadera during Israel's Fallen Soldiers Remembrance Day.
- July 26 – Attack on the embassy of Israel in London: A vehicle packed with 30 pounds of explosives exploded at the Israeli Embassy in London, wounding 20. Five Palestinians were arrested in London in January 1995 in connection with both bombings.
- October 9 – Kidnapping of Nachshon Wachsman: IDF soldier Corporal Nachshon Wachsman is kidnapped by Hamas militants disguised as Jewish settlers. They later demand the release of Sheikh Ahmed Yassin and another 200 Palestinian Arab prisoners from Israeli prison in return for Wachsman's release.
- October 19 – Dizengoff Street bus bombing: 21 Israelis and a Dutch national are killed after a suicide attack on a bus in Tel Aviv. This was the first major suicide bombing in Tel Aviv. Hamas claims responsibility for the bombing.
- November 11 – Netzarim Junction bicycle bombing: Three Israeli soldiers are killed when a Palestinian Arab detonated explosives strapped to his body as he rode his bicycle into an Israeli Army checkpoint at a road junction close to the former Israeli settlement of Netzarim.
- November 30 – IDF soldier Sgt. Liat Gabai, 19, is axed to death by the Palestinian Arab Islamic militant Wahib Abu Alrub in the center of the Israeli city Afula.
- December 25 – Jerusalem Binyanei HaUma suicide bombing: 13 people are injured in a suicide bombing attack in Jerusalem. Hamas claims responsibility.

Notable Israeli military operations against Palestinian militancy targets
The most prominent Israeli military counter-terrorism operations (military campaigns and military operations) carried out against Palestinian militants during 1994 include:

- October 14 – Israeli elite special forces unit Sayeret Matkal attempt to free the kidnapped IDF hostage Nachshon Wachsman held by Palestinian assailants in the village of Bir Nabala in the West Bank; Wachsman and Nir Poraz, the commander of the rescue force, are killed by the assailants during the raid.

== Notable deaths ==
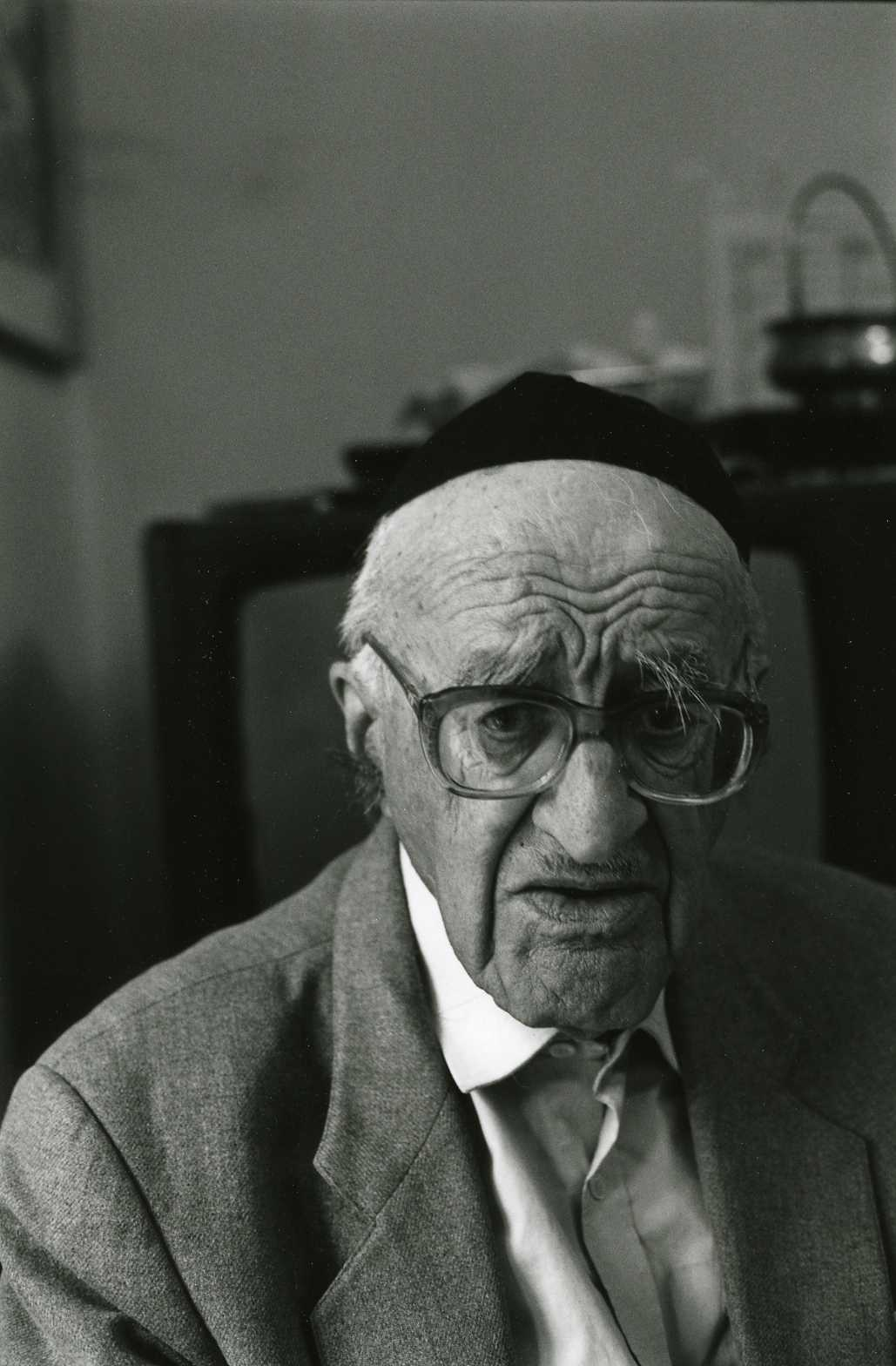
Yeshayahu Leibowitz

- January 10 – Yigal Hurvitz (born 1918), Israeli politician.
- January 12 – Nehemiah Tamari (born 1946), Israeli major general (Aluf) and head of Central Command.
- February 13 – Simcha Holtzberg (born 1924), Polish-born Israeli activist and Holocaust survivor.
- February 19 – Yitzhak Yitzhaky (born 1936), Israeli educator and politician.
- April 3 – Aharon Remez (born 1919), Israeli civil servant, politician and diplomat, and the second commander of the Israeli Air Force.
- May 7 – Haim Bar-Lev (born 1924), Austrian-born Israeli general and politician, eighth Chief of General Staff of the IDF.
- June 6 – Yohai Ben-Nun (born 1924), Sixth commander of the Israeli Navy.
- June 16 – Yohanan Bader (born 1901), Austro-Hungarian (Galicia)-born Revisionist Zionist leader and Israeli politician.
- July 6 – Baruch Osnia (born 1905), Russian (Belarus)-born Israeli politician
- August 8 – Mordechai Seter (born 1916), Russian-born Israeli composer.
- August 18 – Yeshayahu Leibowitz (born 1903), Russian (Latvia)-born Israeli philosopher and scientist.
- September 5 – Shimshon Amitsur (born 1921), Israeli mathematician.
- October 14 – Nachshon Wachsman (born 1975), kidnapped IDF soldier, killed during an attempted rescue operation.
- October 29 – Shlomo Goren (born 1917), Polish-born Ashkenazi Chief Rabbi of Israel.

== See also ==
- 1994 in Israeli film
- 1994 in Israeli television
- 1994 in Israeli music
- 1994 in Israeli sport
- Israel at the 1994 Winter Olympics
