= 1947 in Jordan =

- Decades: 1920s; 1930s; 1940s; 1950s; 1960s
- See also: Other events of 1947; Timeline of Jordanian history

Events from the year 1947 in Jordan.

== Incumbents ==
- Monarch: Abdullah I
- Prime Minister:
  - until 4 February: Ibrahim Hashem
  - 4 February-28 December: Samir al-Rifai
  - starting 28 December: Tawfik Abu al-Huda

== Politics ==
- 1947 Transjordanian general election - General elections, 20 October.

== See also ==
- Years in Iraq
- Years in Syria
- Years in Saudi Arabia
