= 1954 in Jordan =

- Decades: 1930s; 1940s; 1950s; 1960s; 1970s
- See also: Other events of 1954; Timeline of Jordanian history

Events from the year 1954 in Jordan.

== Incumbents ==
- Monarch: Hussein
- Prime Minister: Fawzi al-Mulki (until 4 May), Tawfik Abu al-Huda (starting 4 May)

== Events ==
- 1954 Jordanian general election.

== See also ==
- Years in Iraq
- Years in Syria
- Years in Saudi Arabia
