= Alec Kirkbride =

British diplomat (1897–1978)

Sir Alec Seath Kirkbride KCMG OBE MC (1897–1978) was a British diplomat, a proconsul, who served in Jordan and Palestine between 1920 and 1951. He was the British Resident in Transjordan from 1939 to 1946 and later became the first British ambassador to the country.

== Biography ==
Kirkbride was born in Mansfield, Nottinghamshire, on 19 August 1897 to British parents and grew up in Egypt. He began his military career as an officer in the army of General Allenby from 1916 to 1921. In 1920, after the Battle of Maysalun and the fall of Faisal's government of Syria left Transjordan with no central authority, he was dispatched by the British government to Transjordan to help maintain order during this interregnum. "With a fine sense of history" he established the ephemeral but whimsically named "National Government of Moab" in Kerak with himself as president, which lasted until Abdullah took control of the country. (His younger brother Alan similarly formed the "Ammonite Government" in Amman.) From 1922 to 1927 and from 1937 to 1939, he was governor of Acre and of the district of Galilee in Palestine. He was Deputy Resident in Transjordan from 1927 to 1937 and Resident from 1939 to 1946, and was one of Abdullah's leading British advisors.

In 1946 Transjordan gained independence. Kirkbride was then appointed ambassador of the United Kingdom to The Hashemite Kingdom of Transjordan (which became The Hashemite Kingdom of Jordan in 1949) and played an important diplomatic role during the 1948 Arab-Israeli war.

From 1952 to 1954, he was ambassador to Libya. He was appointed KCMG in the 1949 Birthday Honours.

He ended his career as director of the British Bank of the Middle East, later writing academic books and articles on the Middle East, including two volumes of memoirs.

== Works ==
- Kirkbride, Alec Seath (1956). A Crackle of Thorns: Experiences in the Middle East. London: J. Murray.
- Kirkbride, Alec Seath (1971). An Awakening: The Arab Campaign 1917–1918. Tavistock: University Press of Arabia. ISBN 0-904066-02-9.
- Kirkbride, Alec Seath (1976). From the Wings: Amman Memoirs, 1947–1951. London: F. Cass. ISBN 0-7146-3061-6.

== See also ==
- Timeline of the Hashemite Kingdom of Jordan

== Sources ==
- Yoav Gelber (24 November 2023). Palestine 1948: War, Escape And The Emergence Of The Palestinian Refugee Problem. Sussex Academic Pr. p. 402. ISBN 978-1-84519-075-0.
- Dominique Lapierre; Larry Collins (1971). O Jérusalem. Robert Laffont. p. 870. ISBN 2-266-10698-8.
- Howard Sachar (1969). The Emergence of the Middle East: 1914–1924. Knopf.
- Christopher Sykes (1965). Crossroads to Israel. World Publishing Company.
