= 1923 in Mandatory Palestine =

- 1923 in the British Mandate of Palestine
«««
1922
1921
1920
»»»
1924
1925
1926
See also:
1923 in the United Kingdom
Other events of 1923

Several events and notable births happened during 1923 in the British Mandate of Palestine.

== Incumbents ==
- High Commissioner – Sir Herbert Louis Samuel
- Emir of Transjordan – Abdullah I bin al-Hussein
- Prime Minister of Transjordan – 'Ali Rida Basha al-Rikabi until 1 February; Mazhar Raslan (acting prime minister) until 5 September; Hasan Khalid Abu al-Huda

== Events ==
=== May ===
- 15 May – Britain recognizes Transjordan as an independent government, although it still remains under the British Mandate of Palestine.

=== June ===
- 16–20 June – Sixth Palestine Arab Congress held in Jaffa.

=== July ===
- The Palestine Communist Party is formed through a merger of Palestinian Communist Party and the Communist Party of Palestine.

=== September ===
- 26 September – The British Mandate for Palestine, a legal instrument for the administration of Palestine, confirmed by the Council of the League of Nations on 24 July 1922, comes into effect.

=== Unknown date ===
- The founding of Ramat HaSharon, at the time named Ir Shalom (Hebrew: עִיר שָׁלוֹם, lit. City of Peace), by a group of Jewish immigrants from Poland.

== Notable births ==
- 21 February - Avraham Biton, Israeli politician (died 2005).
- 6 March - Gideon Ben-Yisrael, Israeli politician (died 2014).
- 10 March - Shmuel Tamir, Israeli lawyer and politician (died 1987).
- 13 March – Eliezer Kashani, Irgun fighter, one of the Olei Hagardom (died 1947).
- 7 June – Uzzi Ornan, Israeli linguist (died 2022).
- 20 July – Mattityahu Peled, Israeli general and peace activist (died 1995).
- 2 September – Moshe Kelman, Israeli military officer (died 1980).
- 12 September – Aviad Yafeh, Israeli politician (died 1977).
- 15 September – Yosef Harish, Israeli jurist, Attorney General of Israel (died 2013).
- 27 September – Meir Avizohar, Israeli politician (died 2008).
- 9 October – Haim Gouri, Israeli poet, novelist, journalist and documentary filmmaker (died 2018).

=== Full date Unknown ===
- Fatima al-Budeiri, Palestinian radio broadcaster (died 2009).
- Yisrael Galili (Balashnikov), Israeli weapons designer (died 1995).

== Notable deaths ==
=== Full date unknown ===
- Haim Aharon Valero (born 1845), banker and entrepreneur.
