= Public holidays in Jordan =

Public holidays in Jordan.

Date	English name	Local name	Remarks	Official Business
1 January	New Year's Day	Ras Assanah al-Miladi		Closed
1 May	Labour Day	Eid el-Ommal		Closed
25 May	Independence Day	Eid al-Istiklaal		Closed
25 December	Christmas Day	Eid Al Milad Al Majeed, Al Eid Il Sagheer	Christmas in Jordan is celebrated by all denominations according to Catholic date (Orthodox date on January 7).	Closed
1 Muharram	Hijri New Year	Ras Assanah Al Hijri	Islamic New Year	Closed
12 Rabi' al-awwal	Prophet Muhammad's Birthday	Mawlid al-Nabi		Closed
1 Shawwal	The Little Feast	Eid al-Fitr	Commemorates end of Ramadan	Closed
10 Dhu'l-Hijja	Feast of the Sacrifice or the Big Feast	Eid al-Adha	Commemorates Abraham's willingness to sacrifice his son.	Closed

Note: Holidays in Jordan are often flexible. It is common for the government to change the day which a holiday is supposed to be celebrated on to another day — usually to prolong weekend.

Jordanian Christians also have December 26th, Palm Sunday, Easter Sunday, and Easter Monday as public holidays, with Easter being celebrated by all denominations according to the Orthodox date.
