= 2002 in Jordan =

- Decades: 1980s; 1990s; 2000s; 2010s; 2020s
- See also: Other events of 2002; Timeline of Jordanian history

The following lists events that happened during 2002 in Jordan.

== Incumbents ==
- Monarch - Abdullah II
- Prime Minister - Ali Abu Al-Ragheb

== Events ==
- 2002–03 Jordan League

=== April ===
- April 26-28 - 2002 Asian Taekwondo Championships

=== July ===
- July 10-15 - 2002 Asian Women's Junior Handball Championship

=== September ===
- Jordan at the 2002 Asian Games

== See also ==
- Years in Iraq
- Years in Syria
- Years in Saudi Arabia
