= 1997 in Jordan =

- Decades: 1970s; 1980s; 1990s; 2000s; 2010s
- See also: Other events of 1997; Timeline of Jordanian history

Events from the year 1997 in Jordan.

== Incumbents ==
- Monarch: Hussein
- Prime Minister: Abdul Karim al-Kabariti (until 9 March), Abdelsalam al-Majali (starting 9 March)

== Events ==
- 1997 Jordanian general election
- Khaled Mashal assassination attempt

== See also ==
- Years in Iraq
- Years in Syria
- Years in Saudi Arabia
