= 1959 in Jordan =

- Decades: 1930s; 1940s; 1950s; 1960s; 1970s
- See also: Other events of 1959; Timeline of Jordanian history

Events from the year 1959 in Jordan.

== Incumbents ==
- Monarch: Hussein
- Prime Minister: Samir al-Rifai (until 6 May), Hazza' al-Majali (starting 6 May)

== Sports ==
- 1959 Jordan League

== Establishments ==
- Al-Yarmouk FC.

== See also ==
- Years in Iraq
- Years in Syria
- Years in Saudi Arabia
