= 1961 in Jordan =

- Decades: 1940s; 1950s; 1960s; 1970s; 1980s
- See also: Other events of 1961; Timeline of Jordanian history

Events from the year 1961 in Jordan.

== Incumbents ==
- Monarch: Hussein
- Prime Minister: Bahjat Talhouni

== Events ==
- Ahmad Lozi elected to the House of Representatives for the district of Amman.

== See also ==
- Years in Iraq
- Years in Syria
- Years in Saudi Arabia
