= 1994 in Jordan =

- Decades: 1970s; 1980s; 1990s; 2000s; 2010s
- See also: Other events of 1994; Timeline of Jordanian history

Events from the year 1994 in Jordan.

== Incumbents ==
- Monarch: Hussein
- Prime Minister: Abdelsalam al-Majali

== Events ==
- Israel–Jordan peace treaty.

== Establishments ==
- Zarqa University.

== See also ==
- Years in Iraq
- Years in Syria
- Years in Saudi Arabia
