= 1995 in Jordan =

- Decades: 1970s; 1980s; 1990s; 2000s; 2010s
- See also: Other events of 1995; Timeline of Jordanian history

Events from the year 1995 in Jordan.

== Incumbents ==
- Monarch: Hussein
- Prime Minister: Abdelsalam al-Majali (until 7 January), Zaid ibn Shaker (starting 7 January)

== Events ==
- The 7.3 M_{w} Gulf of Aqaba earthquake shakes Egypt, Israel, Jordan, and Saudi Arabia with a maximum Mercalli intensity of VIII (Severe), killing eight and injuring 30, and generating a non-destructive tsunami.

== Establishments ==
- Jordan River Foundation

== See also ==
- Years in Iraq
- Years in Syria
- Years in Saudi Arabia
