= 1993 in Jordan =

- Decades: 1970s; 1980s; 1990s; 2000s; 2010s
- See also: Other events of 1993; Timeline of Jordanian history

Events from the year 1993 in Jordan.

== Incumbents ==
- Monarch: Hussein
- Prime Minister: Zaid ibn Shaker (until 29 May), Abdelsalam al-Majali (starting 29 May)

== Births ==
- 25 July - Raja'i Ayed
- Ahmed Al-Essawi

== See also ==
- Years in Iraq
- Years in Syria
- Years in Saudi Arabia
