= 1996 in Jordan =

- Decades: 1970s; 1980s; 1990s; 2000s; 2010s
- See also: Other events of 1996; Timeline of Jordanian history

Events from the year 1996 in Jordan.

== Incumbents ==
- Monarch: Hussein
- Prime Minister: Zaid ibn Shaker (until 4 February), Abdul Karim al-Kabariti (starting 4 February)

== Sports ==
- 1996 AFC Asian Cup qualification
- 1995–96 Jordan League
- 1996–97 Jordan League

== See also ==
- Years in Iraq
- Years in Syria
- Years in Saudi Arabia
