= 1960 in Jordan =

- Decades: 1940s; 1950s; 1960s; 1970s; 1980s
- See also: Other events of 1960; Timeline of Jordanian history

Events from the year 1960 in Jordan.

== Incumbents ==
- Monarch: Hussein
- Prime Minister: Hazza' al-Majali (until 29 August), Bahjat Talhouni (starting 29 August)

== Deaths ==
- 29 August - Hazza' al-Majali

== See also ==
- Years in Iraq
- Years in Syria
- Years in Saudi Arabia
