= 1919 in British-administered Palestine =

«««
1918
»»»
1920
1921
1922
See also:
1919 in the United Kingdom
Other events of 1919

Events in the year 1919 in British-administered Palestine (British-controlled part of OETA territory).

== Events ==
=== January ===
- 3 January – The signing of the Faisal Weizmann Agreement is held by Emir Feisal (son of the King of Hejaz) and Chaim Weizmann (later President of the World Zionist Organization) as part of the Paris Peace Conference.
- 22 January to 10 February – First meeting of the Palestine Arab Congress held in Jerusalem.

=== February ===
- 26 February – The first official meeting of the Zionist General Council.

=== April ===
- 29 April – The Hebrew Scouts Movement is established.

=== August ===
- 8 August – The newspaper Do'ar HaYomm is founded.

=== October ===
- 29 October – King George V approves the award of a Knight Commander of the Order of the British Empire (KBE) to ‘Abdu’l-Baha, following a recommendation by the British military administration in Palestine, citing his cooperation and influence in Haifa during the period of British occupation.

== Notable births ==
- 19 April – Haneh Hadad, Israeli Arab police officer and member of Knesset (died 2020).
- 8 May – Aharon Remez, Israeli civil servant, politician and diplomat, and second commander of the Israeli Air Force (died 1994).
- 10 June – Haidar Abdel-Shafi, Palestinian Arab physician, and later politician (died 2007).
- 21 June – Tsilla Chelton, French actress (died 2012).
- 1 July – Nissim Eliad, Israeli politician (died 2014).
- 2 August – Nehemiah Persoff, Jerusalem-born American Jewish film and television actor, and later painter (died 2022).
- 5 August – Menachem Ratzon, Israeli politician (died 1987).
- 28 August – Jabra Ibrahim Jabra, Palestinian writer and intellectual. (died 1994)
- 22 November – Salem Hanna Khamis, Palestinian statistician and UN official. (died 2005)
- Full date unknown
  - Binyamin Gibli, head of Israeli military intelligence (died 2008).
  - Ya'akov Mizrahi, Israeli politician (died 1979).
  - Hanna Ben Dov, Israeli painter (died 2008).
