= 1952 in Jordan =

- Decades: 1930s; 1940s; 1950s; 1960s; 1970s
- See also: Other events of 1952; Timeline of Jordanian history

Events from the year 1952 in Jordan.

== Incumbents ==
- Monarch: Talal (abdicated 11 August), Hussein (ascended 11 August)
- Prime Minister: Tawfik Abu al-Huda

== Events ==
- 11 August - Crown Prince Hussein, was proclaimed King of the Hashemite Kingdom of Jordan.
- 1952 Beit Jala Raid.

== See also ==
- Years in Iraq
- Years in Syria
- Years in Saudi Arabia
