= 1990 in Jordan =

- Decades: 1970s; 1980s; 1990s; 2000s; 2010s
- See also: Other events of 1990; Timeline of Jordanian history

Events from the year 1990 in Jordan.

== Incumbents ==
- Monarch: Hussein
- Prime Minister: Mudar Badran

== Births ==
- 7 May - Ahmed Abu Kabeer.
- Hatem Abu Khadra.

== Establishments ==
- Jordanian Democratic Popular Unity Party.

== See also ==
- Years in Iraq
- Years in Syria
- Years in Saudi Arabia
