= 1951 in Jordan =

- Decades: 1930s; 1940s; 1950s; 1960s; 1970s
- See also: Other events of 1951; Timeline of Jordanian history

Events from the year 1951 in Jordan.

== Incumbents ==
- Monarch: Abdullah I (until 20 July), Talal (starting 20 July)
- Prime Minister: Samir al-Rifai (until 25 July), Tawfik Abu al-Huda (starting 25 July)

== Establishments ==
- Foundation of Jordan Archaeological Museum in Amman.

== See also ==
- Years in Iraq
- Years in Syria
- Years in Saudi Arabia
