= 1998 in Jordan =

- Decades: 1970s; 1980s; 1990s; 2000s; 2010s
- See also: Other events of 1998; Timeline of Jordanian history

Events from the year 1998 in Jordan.

== Incumbents ==
- Monarch: Hussein
- Prime Minister: Abdelsalam al-Majali (until 20 August), Fayez al-Tarawneh (starting 20 August)

== Establishments ==
- Maktoob.

== See also ==
- Years in Iraq
- Years in Syria
- Years in Saudi Arabia
