= 1957 in Jordan =

- Decades: 1930s; 1940s; 1950s; 1960s; 1970s
- See also: Other events of 1957; Timeline of Jordanian history

Events from the year 1957 in Jordan.

== Incumbents ==
- Monarch: Hussein
- Prime Minister:
  - until 13 April: Suleiman Nabulsi
  - 15 April-24 April: Husayin al-Khalidi
  - starting 24 April: Ibrahim Hashem

== Events ==
- April 13- Failed coup d'état.
- April 17- A Vickers Valletta C.1 (VW832) of the RAF crashes in Queria after the plane's left wing detached in turbulence 5 minutes after takeoff from Aqaba for Habbaniya, killing all 26 occupants. The crash is currently Jordan's deadliest.

== See also ==
- Years in Iraq
- Years in Syria
- Years in Saudi Arabia
