= 2021 in Jordan =

- Decades: 2000s; 2010s; 2020s
- See also: Other events of 2021; Timeline of Jordanian history

Events in the year 2021 in Jordan.

== Incumbents ==
- King – Abdullah II
- Prime Minister – Bisher Al-Khasawneh

== Events ==
Ongoing — COVID-19 pandemic in Jordan

- 3 April - 2021 alleged Jordanian coup d'état attempt

== Deaths ==
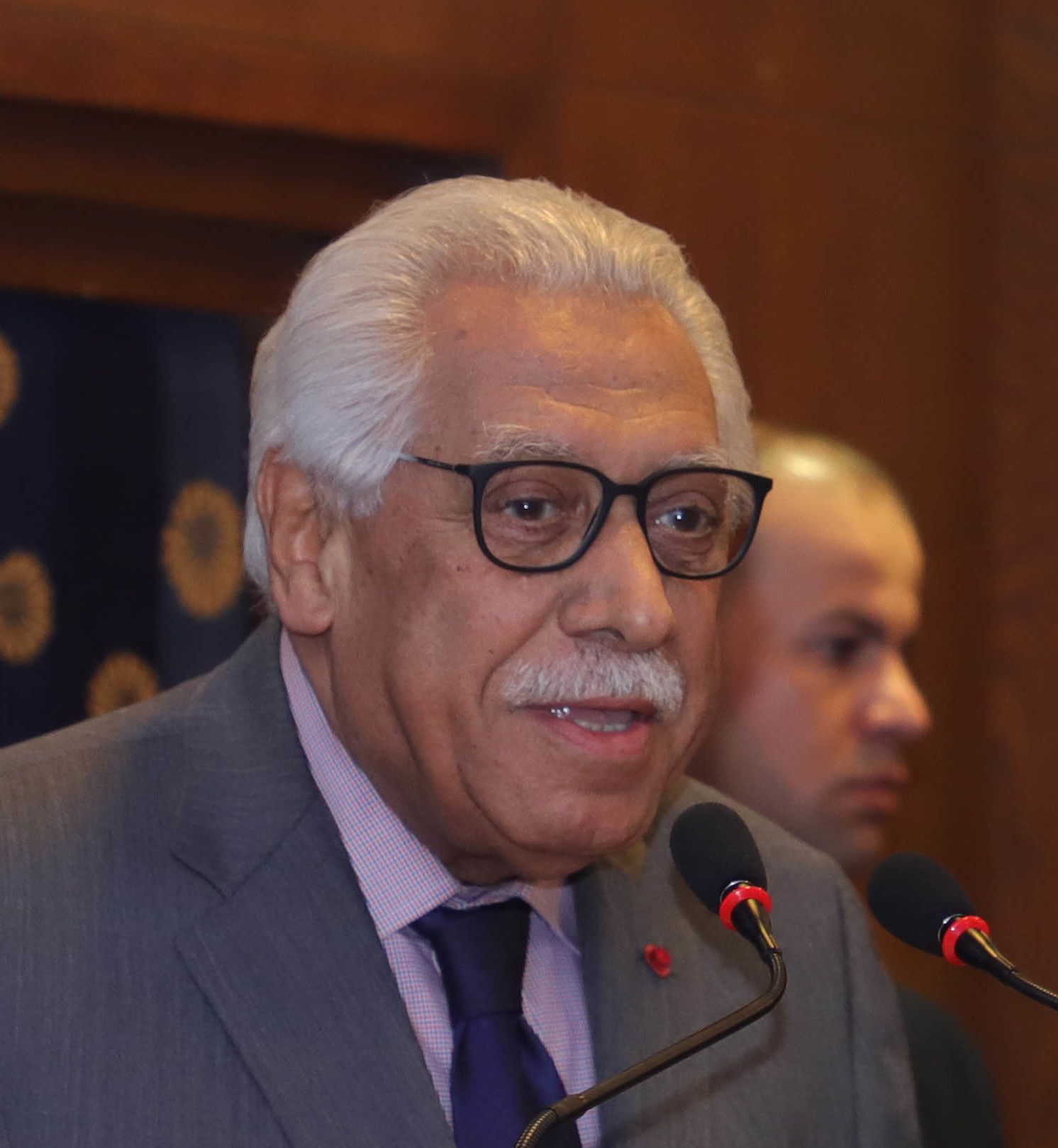
Aqel Biltaji

- 11 January – Yousef Ghawanmeh, historian and anthropologist (born 1935).
- 28 February – Aqel Biltaji, politician (born 1941).
- 26 August – Ibrahim Ghosheh, Palestinian political figure (born 1936).
