= 1991 in Jordan =

- Decades: 1970s; 1980s; 1990s; 2000s; 2010s
- See also: Other events of 1991; Timeline of Jordanian history

Events from the year 1991 in Jordan.

== Incumbents ==
- Monarch: Hussein
- Prime Minister:
  - until 19 June: Mudar Badran
  - 19 June-21 November: Taher al-Masri
  - starting 21 November: Zaid ibn Shaker

== Sports ==
- 1991–92 Jordan League

== Births ==
- 6 January - Zaid Jaber
- 10 January - Saddam Abdel-Muhsan
- 21 December - Baraah Awadallah

== See also ==
- Years in Iraq
- Years in Syria
- Years in Saudi Arabia
