= 1955 in Jordan =

- Decades: 1930s; 1940s; 1950s; 1960s; 1970s
- See also: Other events of 1955; Timeline of Jordanian history

Events from the year 1955 in Jordan.

== Incumbents ==
- Monarch: Hussein
- Prime Minister:
  - until 30 May: Tawfik Abu al-Huda
  - 30 May-15 December: Sa`id al-Mufti
  - 15 December-21 December: Hazza' al-Majali
  - starting 21 December: Ibrahim Hashem

== Events ==
- November-December: a fresh wave of riots oust the government and police crush uprising.

== Establishments ==
- American Community School in Amman.

== See also ==
- Years in Iraq
- Years in Syria
- Years in Saudi Arabia
