= 1920 in British-administered Palestine =

«««
1919
1918
»»»
1921
1922
1923
See also:
1920 in the United Kingdom

Events in the year 1920 in British-administered Palestine (British-controlled part of OETA territory).

== Incumbents ==
- High Commissioner – Sir Herbert Louis Samuel from 1 July

== Events ==
=== February ===
- 9-17 February — A large blizzard known as the "Great Blizzard" creates record cold and snowfall in Jerusalem.
- 24 February – The Conference of London ends with agreement among Britain, France and Italy on partitioning of the Ottoman Empire.

=== March ===
- 1 March – Zionist activist Joseph Trumpeldor and five Palestinian Jewish fighters are killed in the battle of Tel Hai. The battle, which gave Tel Hai its long-enduring fame, was significant far beyond the small number of fighters involved on either side – mainly due to its influence on Zionist history, both inspiring an enduring heroic myth and profoundly influencing Zionist military and political strategies over several decades.

=== April ===
- 4–7 April – Nebi Musa Riots in and around the Old City of Jerusalem mark the first large-scale skirmish of the Arab–Israeli conflict. Four Arabs and five Jews are killed, while 216 Jews (18 critically) and 23 Arabs (one critically) are wounded. The majority of the victims were members of the old Yishuv, largely non-Zionist or anti-Zionist Orthodox Jews. About 300 Jews from the Old City of Jerusalem are evacuated.
- 19 April – First Assembly of Jewish Representatives elected.
- 26 April – The San Remo conference ends, during which the Allied Supreme Council agree to allocate the mandate of Palestine to the United Kingdom, incorporating the terms set forth in the Balfour Declaration.

=== May ===
- 31 May – Second Palestine Arab Congress, held in secret because banned by British authorities.
- 12 June – Following the Battle of Tel Hai, the Jewish leadership in Palestine establishes the Jewish paramilitary organisation "Haganah" to protect Jewish farms and kibbutzim, believing that the Jewish population in Palestine could not rely on the British administration for protection from the frequent attacks carried out by local Arab gangs against Palestinian Jews.

=== June ===
- 30 June – Two Arabs shot dead by British troops during demonstrations in Jaffa following the landing of new Jewish immigrants.

=== July ===
- 1 July –
  - Sir Herbert Louis Samuel is appointed the first British High Commissioner of Palestine.
  - Completion of the Palin Report on the 1920 Nebi Musa riots.
- 13–14 July – The Muslim-Christian Associations hold a two-day general strike protesting against the mandate and the behaviour of the British army.

=== August ===
- 7 August – Sir Herbert Louis Samuel's request to extend the frontier of British territory beyond the Jordan River and to bring Transjordan under his administrative control is rejected. The British Foreign Secretary, Lord Curzon, proposed instead that British influence in Transjordan should be advanced by sending a few political officers, without military escort, to encourage self-government and give advice to local leaders in the territory.
- 10 August – The Treaty of Sèvres endorses the allocation to the United Kingdom of a mandate of Palestine. The treaty is stillborn and subsequently superseded by the Treaty of Lausanne.

=== September ===
- The founding of the kibbutz Degania Bet by immigrants from the Second Aliyah.

=== October ===
- 7 October - The establishment of the Jewish National Council, the main national institution of the Jewish community (Yishuv) within the British Mandate of Palestine.

=== December ===
- 4 December – Third Palestine Arab Congress held in Haifa.
- 6 December – The Histadrut is established in Haifa to look after the interests of Jewish workers.
- 23 December – The United Kingdom and France ratify the border between French-controlled Syria and British-controlled Palestine.

== Notable births ==
- 19 January – Mordechai Maklef, Israeli general, 3rd IDF Chief of General Staff (died 1978).
- 1 June – Amos Yarkoni, Israeli Bedouin senior IDF officer (died 1991).
- 12 June – Ephraim Evron, Israeli diplomat (died 1995).
- Full date unknown
  - Matanya Abramson, Israeli sculptor (died 2004).
  - Michael Gross, Israeli painter, sculptor and conceptual artist (died 2004).
  - Hasib Sabbagh, Palestinian Arab businessman (died 2010).
  - Serene Husseini Shahid, Palestinian writer and teacher.(died 2008)

== Notable deaths ==
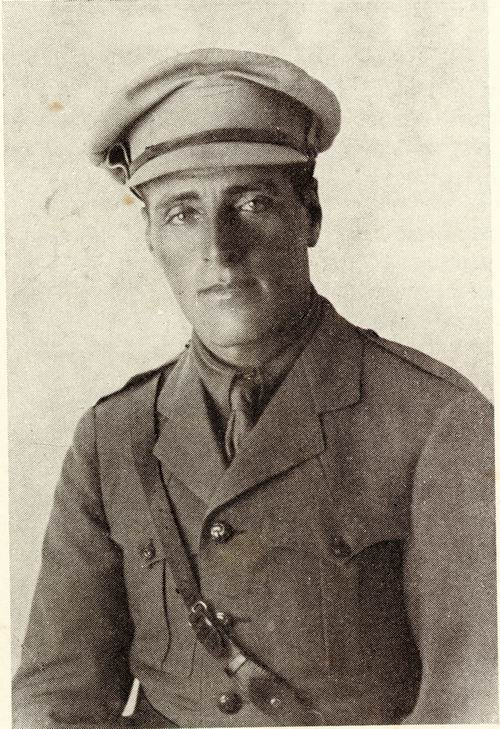
Joseph Trumpeldor

- 1 March – Joseph Trumpeldor (born 1880), Russian-born early Zionist activist.
