= 1958 in Jordan =

- Decades: 1930s; 1940s; 1950s; 1960s; 1970s
- See also: Other events of 1958; Timeline of Jordanian history

Events from the year 1958 in Jordan.

== Incumbents ==
- Monarch: Hussein
- Prime Minister: Ibrahim Hashem (until 6 May), Samir al-Rifai (starting 6 May)

== Events ==
- 1958 Jordan crisis.

== See also ==
- Years in Iraq
- Years in Syria
- Years in Saudi Arabia
