= 2025 in Jordan =

- Decades: 2000s; 2010s; 2020s
- See also: Other events of 2025; Timeline of Jordanian history

Events in the year 2025 in Jordan.

== Incumbents ==
- Monarch – Abdullah II
- Prime Minister – Jafar Hassan

== Events ==
=== February ===
- 10 February – An Indian national is shot dead by the Jordanian Army at the Jordan–Israel border after attempting to enter Israel illegally.

=== April ===
- 15 April – The General Intelligence Department announces the arrest of 16 people involved in a plot to undermine Jordan's national security.
- 23 April – The government orders another ban on the Muslim Brotherhood.

=== May ===
- 4 May – Two Belgian nationals are killed in a flash flood in Wadi al-Nakhil, Ma'an Governorate.

=== June ===
- 5 June – Jordan qualifies for its first FIFA World Cup after defeating Oman 3-0 at the 2026 FIFA World Cup qualification in Muscat.
- 14 June – Five people are injured in Irbid by falling debris from a suspected Iranian missile fired as part of the June 2025 Iranian strikes on Israel.

=== July ===
- 31 July – Osama Krayem, a Swedish Islamic State militant, is convicted and sentenced to life imprisonment in Sweden for the killing of Jordanian pilot Muath al-Kasasbeh in Syria in 2015.

=== August ===
- 27 August – King Abdullah II and Kazakh President Kassym-Jomart Tokayev announce that Royal Jordanian will launch direct Amman to Almaty flights in 2026.

=== September ===
- 18 September – Two Israelis are shot dead at the Allenby Bridge border crossing with the West Bank. The attacker is shot dead by Israeli forces.
- 24 September – Israel indefinitely closes the Allenby Bridge.
- 27 September – The Ajloun and Yarmouk Forest Reserves are designated as biosphere reserves by UNESCO.

=== November ===
- 29 November – The Government of Jordan officially announces the launch of the Amra City development project during a site visit by the Prime Minister.

=== December ===
- 24 December – The Jordanian Armed Forces carry out airstrikes against drug and weapons traffickers along the border with Syria.

== Holidays ==
- 1 January – New Year's Day
- 29–31 March – Eid al-Fitr
- 20 April – Gregorian Easter
- 1 May – Labour Day
- 25 May – Independence Day
- 6–9 June – Eid al-Adha
- 26 June – Islamic New Year
- 4 September – The Prophet's Birthday
- 25 December – Christmas Day
