= 1956 in Jordan =

- Decades: 1930s; 1940s; 1950s; 1960s; 1970s
- See also: Other events of 1956; Timeline of Jordanian history

Events from the year 1956 in Jordan.

== Incumbents ==
- Monarch: Hussein
- Prime Minister:
  - until 8 January: Ibrahim Hashem (acting)
  - 8 January-22 May: Samir al-Rifai
  - 22 May-1 July: Sa`id al-Mufti
  - 1 July-29 October: Ibrahim Hashem
  - starting 29 October: Suleiman Nabulsi

== Births ==
- 28 May - Khaled Mashal

== See also ==
- Years in Iraq
- Years in Syria
- Years in Saudi Arabia
