= 2022 in Jordan =

- Decades: 2000s; 2010s; 2020s
- See also: Other events of 2022; Timeline of Jordanian history

Events in the year 2022 in Jordan.

== Incumbents ==
- Monarch – Abdullah II
- Prime Minister – Bisher Al-Khasawneh

== Events ==
- 8 March – Jordanian authorities briefly detain journalist Daoud Kuttab following a complaint about a 2019 article.
- 27 June – A chlorine gas leak at Aqaba port kills 13 people and injures at least 260 people.
- 4 September – Jordan hosts the opening of Exercise Eager Lion, a two-week multinational military exercise with the U.S. and 28 other partner nations.
- 15 November – Ahmed Safadi is elected Speaker of the House of Representatives.
- 15 December – 2022 Jordanian protests erupt over rising fuel prices, leading to nationwide road closures by truck drivers and violent clashes with police.
- 27 December – Flash floods hit the ancient city of Petra, caused by a rainstorm; 1,700 tourists are evacuated.
