= 1999 in Jordan =

- Decades: 1970s; 1980s; 1990s; 2000s; 2010s
- See also: Other events of 1999; Timeline of Jordanian history

Events from the year 1999 in Jordan.

== Incumbents ==
- Monarch: Hussein (until 7 February), Abdullah II (starting 7 February)
- Prime Minister: Fayez al-Tarawneh (until 4 March), Abdelraouf al-Rawabdeh (starting 4 March)

== Deaths ==
- 7 February - King Hussein

== See also ==
- Years in Iraq
- Years in Syria
- Years in Saudi Arabia
