= Matanya Abramson =

Israeli sculptor

- מתניה אברמסון
- Abramson in 1977
- Born: 1920; Moshavat Kinneret, Mandatory Palestine
- Died: February 2004 (aged 83–84)

Matanya Abramson (Hebrew: מתניה אברמסון; 1920–2004) was an Israeli sculptor whose sculptures have been exhibited worldwide as well as in Israel. Matanya was a versatile artist who worked in marble, stone, and wood, as well as with bronze, aluminum and copper castings.

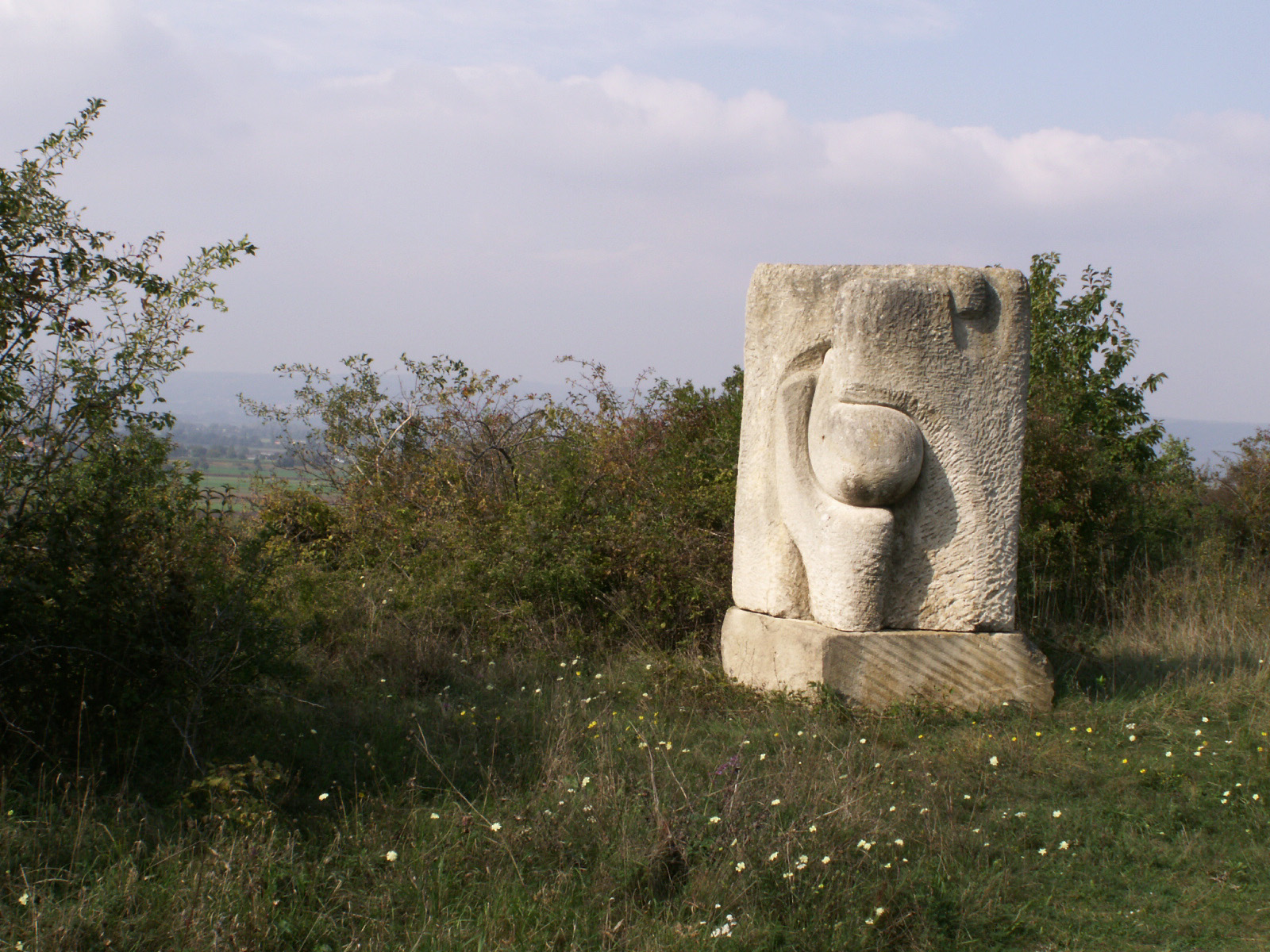
"Symposion Europäischer Bildhauer", St.Margarethen – Burgenland/Austria, Matanya Abramson, 1969

== Biography ==
Abramson was born in Kinneret, on the shores of the Sea of Galilee. He was the son of a pioneering farmer family that immigrated from Russia in the early 1900s.

Abramson started painting during his childhood. After completing studies at the Mikve Israel agricultural school, he studied painting with various Israeli artists. He spent 12 years in military service in the Haganah, including the Palmach, the Haganah's elite strike arm, as well as the Palmach's naval commando force, the Palyam, the Jewish Settlement Police, the Royal Navy, and the Israel Defense Forces.

After the 1947–1949 Palestine war, Abramson studied sculpture from Schwarzmann and Koso Elul and spent 6 months in Paris in 1954. After returning from Paris, he went back to the farm in the Kinneret and worked in agriculture, pursuing art in his free time.

In 1959, Abramson left the farming village and moved to the artists' quarter in Safed.

In 1962 he went to Italy for two years, pursuing his art. Six months were spent in the marble mines in Carrara, and a year and a half was spent in Florence. All his works from Italy were sent to an exhibition in New York in October 1963.

In 1964 he came back to Israel, living in the Ein-Kerem neighborhood of Jerusalem. In 1965 Abramson moved to Old Jaffa.

Abramson died in February 2004 and was buried in his home village, Kinneret, on the shores of the Sea of Galilee.

== Exhibitions & monuments ==
1960 - One Man Show - ZOA House, Tel Aviv

1963 - One Man Show - Gallery Numero, Florence

1963 - One Man Show - Gallery Vercel, New-York

1965 - One Man Show - Gallery Vercel, New-York

1965 - Monument - Kibbutz Ein-Gedi (Israel)

1966 - One Man Show - Hamam, Old Jaffa (Israel)

1966 - Exhibition with the painter Alexander - Museum, Ramat Gan (Israel)

1967 - Exhibition with the painter Rosenboim - Museum, Bat-Yam (Israel)

1967 - Memorial Monument to the Fallen - Kinneret (Israel)

1968 - Third prize in the contest for building a monument in the square where a synagogue was burned down - Munich

1969 - Participant in an international symposium - Saint-Margareten (Austria)

1970 - One Man Show - Artists House, Jerusalem

1971 - One Man Show - Yarkon Gallery, Boston

1971 - Started work on monument in memory of "Oley Hagardom" - Acre (Israel)

1971 - Memorial Monument for the Fallen - Har-Habanim, Ramat-Gan (Israel)

1978 - One Man Show - Gallery Alte-Schmide, Vienna

1980 – large marble sculpture - Berlin Garden, Neot-Afeka, Tel Aviv

1980 - One Man Show - Jewish-American Congress House, New-York

1983 - One Man Show - Herzliya Museum, Herzliya (Israel)

1986 - One Man Show - Institute Francais, Vienna

1986 - One Man Show - Gallery Susan Fischer, Baden-Baden

1992 - Exhibition with the painter Kipnis - Zurich Kosmus, Vienna
