= 1947 Transjordanian general election =

General elections were held in Transjordan on 20 October 1947. As political parties were banned at the time, all candidates were independents.
