= 1954 Jordanian general election =

General elections were held in Jordan on 16 October 1954, the first that political parties were allowed to contest. The result was a victory for independent candidates, which won 38 of the 40 seats, with the other two going to the Liberal Party and the Umma Party.

== Results ==
Party	Votes	%	Seats
Liberal Party			1
Umma Party			1
Independents			38
Total			40
Registered voters/turnout	445,928	–	
Source: Nohlen et al.
