= Hanna Ben Dov =

Israeli painter (1919–2008)

- חנה בן-דב
- Born: 1919; Jerusalem, Israel
- Died: 2008 (aged 88–89); Paris, France
- Known for: Painting

Hanna Ben Dov (Hebrew: חנה בן-דב; 1919 in Jerusalem – 2008 in Paris) was an Israeli abstract painter.

== Life & Work ==
Ben Dov's father, Ya'ackov Ben-Dov, was a famous Israeli photographer who founded the photography department in the Bezalel Academy of Art and Design in 1910. Hannah herself attended Bezalel during the 1940s, and later continued to Camberwell College of Arts in London. After the completion of her formal education she moved to Paris, where she exhibited for the first time in 1948 and has been living and working there since, as a part of the local abstract artists school. She took part in the first French Biennale of 1951, that was held in Menton.

== Collections ==
Her paintings can be found in several collections, including the French State Collection, the Tel Aviv Museum of Art collection, the Bezalel National Museum collection in Jerusalem and the Rockefeller Museum collection in New York.

== Exhibitions ==
- Gallery97 Tel Aviv Paintings by Hanna Ben Dov. May, 2008. Tel Aviv

French Biennale. Menton, France. 1951

"In the wide jungle of painting’s salons in Paris, I found, from time to time, a sort of a relaxation spot, a spot that made me want to come closer and look at it, and I always realized, in the same pleasant way you meet a true friend, that these are Hannah Ben Dov’s paintings. This is the way I came to know this painter. In the atmosphere that surrounds the front line of today’s painting bursa, which loud and fast new orientations are in the top of all, as is they are objects of entertainment, and they do not leave the time to absorb, it is very nice to run into artists such as Hannah Ben Dov who lives by her own standard. Near the painting stand, in a work that knows no compromises, these sorts of artists are like a praying religious man. They practice the values of painting that have no substitutes and no profit. The constant development of Ben Dov, which I have been observing for sometime now, never depended on signs from the outside world, but instead, stood in a front line with it, same line that reveals by the power of a jealous work between the artist and himself-- the line of sincerity. It is not difficult to characterize Ben Dov’s work, since she succeeded in understanding the tradition of the French painting. She talks of structure, colors and forms in her paintings. It is typical to a true work of art, which it can not be explain by dismantling, the unity of the work is an unexplained secret, and it is much more valuable then each piece on its own. The creation of Hannah Ben Dov have matured and reached to a place that doesn’t require any expertise terms. Ever since I came to know her work, I appreciated it as a cultural painting. Now days I look at it as painting that already achieved its spiritual goal, and the viewer only have to watch the painting and enjoy its beauty."

J. J. Varen. Paris, 1969.

"LYRICAL ABSTRACTIONS By Hanna Ben Dov, a veteran Israeli painter who studied with Mordechai Ardon at the Bezalel School and who currently lives in Paris, contain all the right elements to make them work. Her paintings are formalist in every sense of the word, composed around the ceremonial postwar nonobjective painting in which expression via action and lyrical, alla prima application of paint command total respect. […]" The Jerusalem Post, December 17, 1993
