= 1946 in Jordan =

- Decades: 1920s; 1930s; 1940s; 1950s; 1960s
- See also: Other events of 1946; Timeline of Jordanian history

The following lists events that happened during 1946 in Jordan.

== Incumbents ==
- Monarch: Abdullah I
- Prime Minister: Ibrahim Hashem

== Events ==
=== March ===
- March 22 - The United Kingdom grants Transjordan, as it is then known, its independence; 3 years later the country changes its name to Jordan.
- March 25 - The Parliament of Transjordan proclaimed Abdullah King.

== See also ==
- Years in Iraq
- Years in Syria
- Years in Saudi Arabia
