= Menachem Ratzon =

Israeli politician

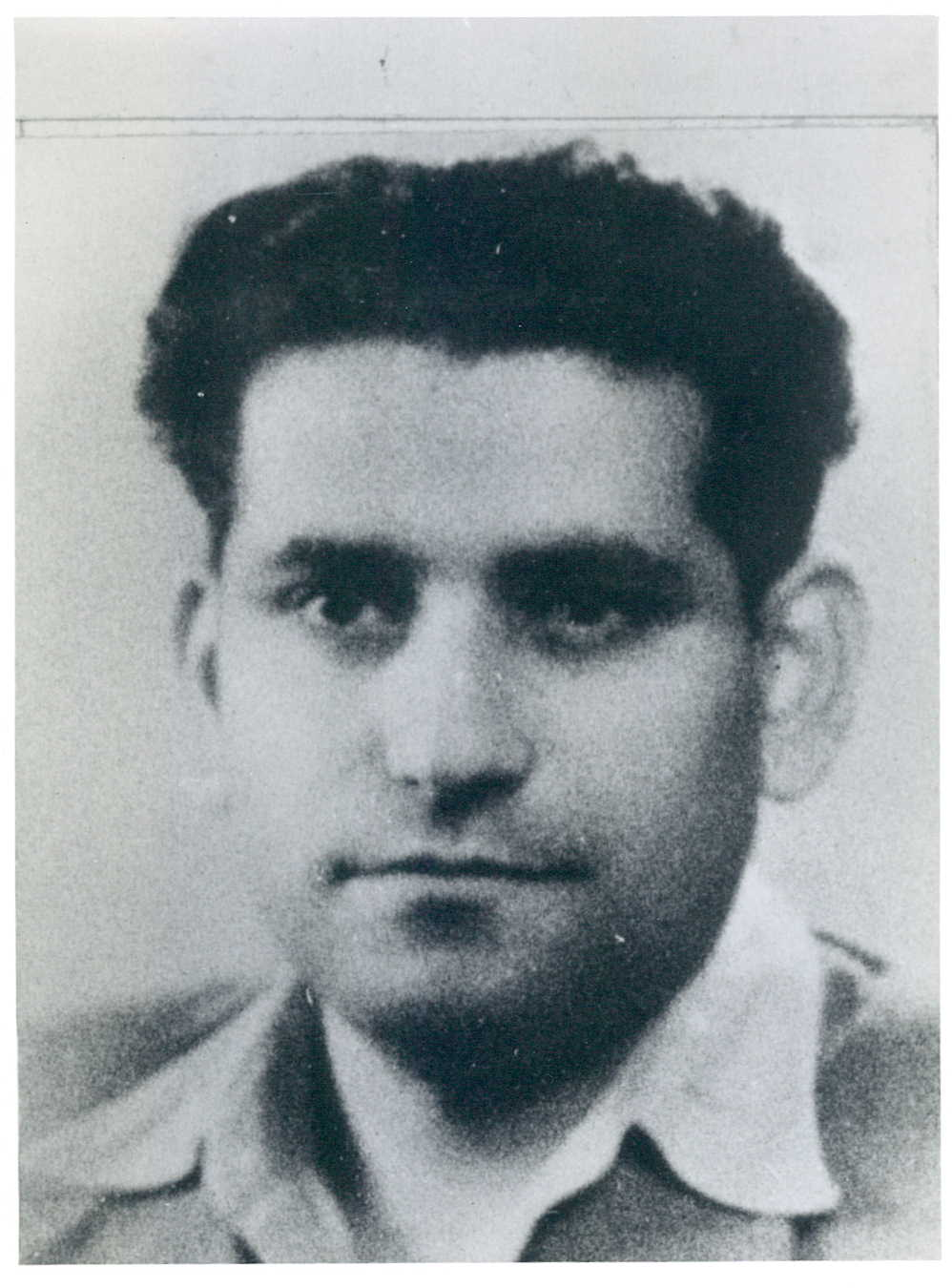
- Ratzon in 1951

Faction represented in the Knesset
- 1951–1951: Mapam

Personal details
- Born: 5 August 1919 Petah Tikva, Mandatory Palestine
- Died: 12 November 1987 (aged 68)

Menachem Ratzon (Hebrew: מְנַחֵם רָצוֹן; 5 August 1919 – 12 November 1987) was an Israeli politician who served as a member of the first Knesset for Mapam.

== Biography ==
Born in Petah Tikva shortly after the end of World War I, Ratzon worked in orchards, industry and as a tour guide. He joined the Socialist League, which later evolved into Hashomer Hatzair Workers Party and then Mapam. He served on the actions committee of the Histadrut trade union, and was also a member of Petah Tikva's Workers Council, and director of its planning department.

He was placed twenty-first on the Mapam list for the 1949 elections, but missed out on a seat as Mapam won 19 mandates. However, he entered the Knesset on 10 April 1951 as a replacement for Dov Bar-Nir, who resigned his seat. For the July 1951 elections he was placed seventeenth on the party's list, but lost his seat as Mapam was reduced to 15 seats. He was twenty-third on the Mapam list for the 1955 elections, but again failed to win a seat.

He died in 1987 at the age of 68. A street in Petah Tikva is named after him.
