= Yousef Ghawanmeh =

Jordanian historian (1935–2021)

- يوسف غوانمة
- Born: 1935; Saham Al-Kefarat, Irbid, Jordan
- Died: 11 January 2021 (aged 85); Amman, Jordan
- Other names: Yusuf Hasan Darwish Ghawanmah
- Occupation(s): Historian, academic, and anthropologist

Yousef Darwish Ghawanmeh (Arabic: يوسف درويش غوانمة) (1935 – 11 January 2021) was a Jordanian historian, anthropologist, professor and author.

== Life ==
He was born in the village of Saham Al-Kefarat north of the city of Irbid. He received his elementary education in his village before moving to the city of Irbid, where he graduated high school, he then earned his bachelor's, master's and doctorate's degrees from Alexandria University and his post-doctorate's degree from Princeton University in the United States in 1979. His works focus on the cultural and political history of Jordan during the Islamic periods.

Ghawanmeh received several awards, including the Arab Historian Medal from the Union of Arab Historians in 1991, the State Appreciation Award in the field of social sciences in 1992, and the Order of Hussein bin Ali of the first class in 2014.

== Bibliography ==
He published more than 30 books, including:

- History of Jerusalem in the Mamluk period
- Islamic scholars and jurists of Irbid in the Islamic period
- Excesses of Batiniyya Shia in the Levant
- Ancient Islamic mosques in Ajloun
