= 2022 Jordanian protests =

Gas price protests in Jordan

- Part of Global energy crisis (2021-present) and the economic impact of the 2022 Russian invasion of Ukraine
- Date: 15 December 2022 – 2023
- Location: Jordan
- Caused by: Rising gas prices
- Methods: Protests, riots and arson
- Status: Ongoing

Parties
Protesters	Law enforcement in Jordan

Casualties
- Deaths: 4 police officers, 1 fighter
- Injuries: "Many"
- Arrested: 44

A series of protests began in Jordan on 15 December 2022, over rising gas prices.

== History ==
The protesting workers, which include goods and passenger transport drivers, are demanding reduction in fuel prices and cancellation of special taxes on fuel derivatives. So far, one senior police officer has been killed after being shot in the head, and three more were killed during a raid carried out to arrest the suspects. One of the suspects, described as a "fighter", was killed. There have also been reports of anti-riot police throwing tear gas during the protests, and youths have clashed with police northeast of Amman. Protesters have staged in the Tafiyla neighborhood of Amman, where police have clashed with protesters saying anti-government slogans. Youths burned tires on a main highway between Amman and the Dead Sea, disrupting the traffic, and highways connecting Amman to Irbid and Karak have been shut down. Youths also clashed with police in several neighborhoods in Irbid threw stones in smaller towns. Some protesters have threatened to stage street protests. In response to the violent protests, Jordan has imposed a temporary ban on popular social media platform TikTok. In a statement, the Public Security Directorate said the widely used but controversial platform was suspended as it was used "for glorifying hate speech and for inciting chaos, attacking law enforcement agencies, and property and blocking roads".
