= 1948 in Jordan =

- Decades: 1920s; 1930s; 1940s; 1950s; 1960s
- See also: Other events of 1948; Timeline of Jordanian history

The following lists events that happened during 1948 in the Hashemite Kingdom of Jordan.

== Incumbents ==
- Monarch: Abdullah I
- Prime Minister: Tawfik Abu al-Huda

== Events ==
=== May ===
- May 15 - The British Mandate of Palestine is officially terminated, causing expeditionary forces from Egypt, Transjordan, Syria and Iraq to invade Israel and clash with Israeli forces.

== See also ==
- Years in Iraq
- Years in Syria
- Years in Saudi Arabia
