= 1922 in Mandatory Palestine =

- 1922 in the British Mandate of Palestine
«««
1921
1920
1919
»»»
1923
1924
1925
See also:
1922 in the United Kingdom
Other events of 1922

Events in the year 1922 in the British Mandate of Palestine.

== Incumbents ==
- High Commissioner – Sir Herbert Louis Samuel
- Emir of Transjordan – Abdullah I bin al-Hussein
- Prime Minister of Transjordan – Mazhar Raslan until 10 March; 'Ali Rida Basha al-Rikabi

== Events ==
=== January ===
- 9 January – Haj Amin al-Husseini, who had become the Mufti of Jerusalem the previous year, is elected head of the Muslim community (Rais al-'Ulama').

=== April ===
- 2 April –
  - The founding of the agricultural settlement Giv'atayim by a group of 22 Second Aliyah pioneers led by David Schneiderman.
  - The founding of the agricultural settlement "Ahuza A – New York" (now Ra'anana), named after the founding company.

=== June ===
- 3 June – The Churchill White Paper is published endorsing the Balfour Declaration but weakening the plans for a Jewish homeland.

=== July ===
- 24 July – The Mandate for Palestine, a legal instrument for the administration of Palestine, is formally confirmed by the Council of the League of Nations.

=== August ===
- 22 August – Fifth Palestine Arab Congress held in Nablus.

=== September ===
- 16 September - Transjordan Memorandum approved. The League of Nations approves British proposal to exclude territory east of the Jordan River (Transjordan) from the Jewish nation home provisions, establishing a formal administrative boundary between Mandatory Palestine and the Emirate of Transjordan.

=== November ===
- 4 November – The founding of the kibbutz Beit Alfa by Hashomer Hatzair volunteers.

=== December ===
- 5 December – The Jewish Agency for Israel is established.

==== Full date unknown ====
- The Industrial Islamic orphanage school is established in the old city of Jerusalem.

== Births ==
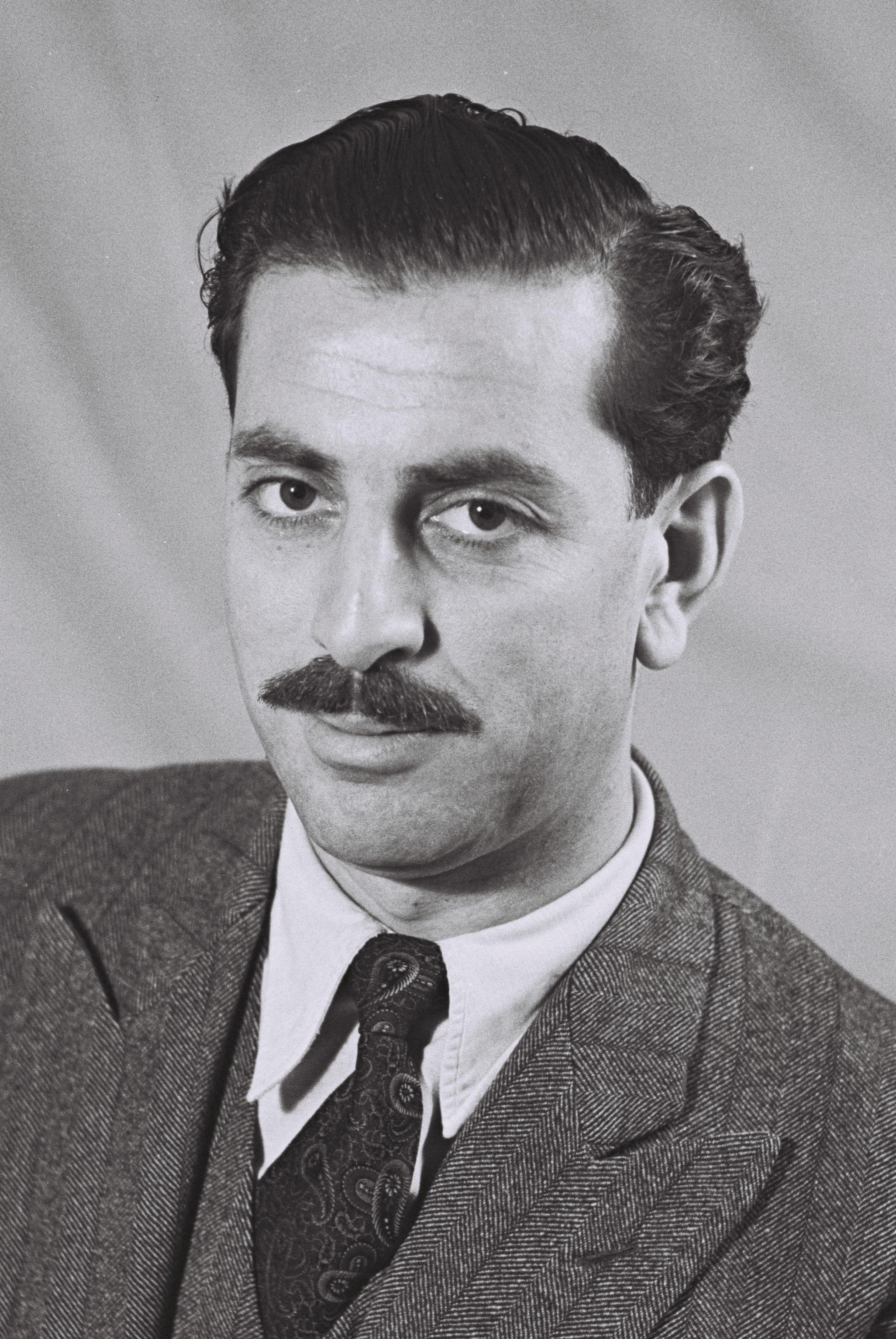
Tawfik Toubi

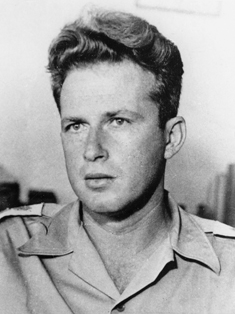
Yitzhak Rabin

- 22 January - Shalom Ronli-Riklis, Israeli musician (died 1994).
- 28 January – Emile Habibi, Israeli Arab writer and politician (died 1996).
- 2 February – Shmuel Agmon, Israeli mathematician (died 2025).
- 10 February – Eliyahu Bet-Zuri, Jewish Lehi activist known for his part in the assassination of Lord Moyne (died 1945).
- 24 February – Pnina Salzman, Israeli pianist (died 2006).
- 1 March – Yitzhak Rabin, Fifth Prime Minister of Israel, recipient of the Nobel Peace Prize (died 1995).
- 12 March – Aviva Uri, Israeli painter (died 1989).
- 11 May – Tawfik Toubi, Israeli Arab communist politician (died 2011).
- 21 May – Moshe Amar, Israeli politician (died 2015).
- 17 June – Avigdor Levontin, Israeli lawyer and diplomat (died 2016).
- 20 June - Eliezer Spiegel, Israeli footballer (died 2017).
- 22 June – Yehoshua Cohen, Israeli Lehi veteran, assassin of Folke Bernadotte (died 1986).
- 5 July – Menachem Cohen, Israeli politician (died 1975).
- 25 August – Ivry Gitlis, Israeli virtuoso violinist (died 2020).
- 9 October – Asaf Simhoni, Israeli general (died 1956).
- 1 December – Amichai Paglin, Israeli businessman and Irgun chief of operations (died 1978).

== Deaths ==
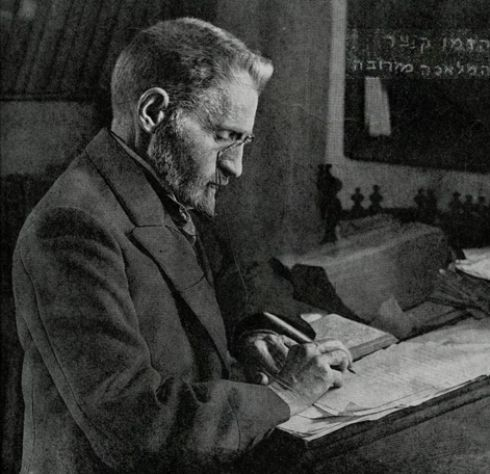
Eliezer Ben-Yehuda

- 22 February – A. D. Gordon (born 1856), Russian (Ukraine)-born Zionist activist, founder of Hapoel Hatzair.
- 16 December – Eliezer Ben-Yehuda (born 1858), Russian (Belarus)-born Jewish lexicographer and newspaper editor, the driving spirit behind the revival of the Hebrew language in the modern era.
