= 2005 in Jordan =

- Decades: 1980s; 1990s; 2000s; 2010s; 2020s
- See also: Other events of 2005; Timeline of Jordanian history

The following lists events that happened during 2005 in Jordan.

== Incumbents ==
- Monarch: Abdullah II
- Prime Minister:
  - until 6 April: Faisal al-Fayez
  - 6 April-27 November: Adnan Badran
  - starting 27 November: Marouf al-Bakhit

== Events ==
=== May ===
- May 27 - Protests have occurred in Jordan after the US military admitted that the Qur'an had been "mishandled" by soldiers.

=== August ===
- August 19 - A Jordanian soldier dies when three unexploded Katyusha rockets miss their targets and hit a warehouse and hospital in Aqaba and hit a road by the airport in nearby Eilat, Israel. A group with alleged links to al-Qaeda claims responsibility for the attacks, stating the targets were US ships docked at the Red Sea port in Aqaba, the USS Kearsarge and the USS Ashland.

=== November ===
- November 9 - Three coordinated attacks on the Grand Hyatt Hotel, Radisson SAS Hotel, and Days Inn in the capital of Amman kill at least 57 people and injure 115 others, mostly Westerners. Abu Musab al-Zarqawi later claims responsibility.
- November 13 - Following coordinated bombings in Amman on November 9, Jordanian police arrest a woman said to be the wife of a suicide attacker.

== See also ==
- Years in Iraq
- Years in Syria
- Years in Saudi Arabia
