= Timeline of Amman =

Coordinates: 31.933333°N 35.933333°E

The following is a timeline of the history of the city of Amman, Kingdom of Jordan.

== Prior to 20th century ==
- 7250 BCE – 'Ain Ghazal Neolithic settlement was built spanning over an area of 15 hectares.
- 800 BCE – Amman Citadel Inscription
- 2nd century CE – Roman theatre and Nymphaeum built (approximate date).
- 3rd century CE – Rujm Al-Malfouf (tower) in use.
- 8th century – Al-Masjid al-Umawi (mosque) and Al-Qasr Umawi (palace) built.
- 1879 – Population: 150. English traveller Laurence Oliphant wrote of a visit in 1879 in his The Land of Gilead, suggesting that the area was uninhabited prior to the arrival of the Circassians. (Note: Oliphant, Land of Gilead, quote: "...we were quickly surrounded by a group of Circassians who have been settled by the order of the Government amidst these ruins... They said that 500 of them had arrived here about three months previously, but that the majority had speedily become discontented with their prospects and had gone away; 150, including women and children, were all that remained, and these had decided to settle here. The spot had been selected, in the first instance, on account of the shelter which the caverns and old rock-cut tombs afforded... It seems never to have been occupied either by the Saracens or Turks, and consequently from the date of the Arab wars in the seventh century has remained a desolation and a wilderness. It has been reserved for the Circassians to be the first settled population, after an interval of more than a thousand years, to take possession of these crumbling remains of former greatness. It is marvellous that during all that time Ammon should have resisted all attempts permanently to change its name, and be known among the Arabs of the present day by the identical appellation it bore when we first heard of it, 1500 years before the Christian era, as being the repository of the great iron bedstead of Og the king of Bashan...")
- 1890 – Population: 1,000.

== 20th century ==
- 1908 – Hejaz Railway in operation.
- 1909
  - Municipal council formed.
  - Population: 2,000 (approximate).
- 1918
  - March: First Battle of Amman.
  - 25 September: Second Battle of Amman.
- 1923 – Al-Husseini Mosque built.
- 1926 – Raghadan Palace built.
- 1928 – Amman becomes capital of the Emirate of Transjordan.
- 1932 – Al-Faisaly Football Club formed.
- 1938 – National electricity company founded.
- 1946 – City becomes capital of the Hashemite Kingdom of Jordan.
- 1947 – Population: 33,110.
- 1948 – Palestinian population expands.
- 1949 – Cornerstone of Church of the Redeemer, Amman is laid.
- 1951 – Jordan Archaeological Museum established.
- 1952 – Population: 103,304.
- 1956 – Al-Wehdat Sports Club formed.
- 1958 – Amman Surgical Hospital built.
- 1961
  - Abu Darweesh Mosque built.
  - Population: 246,475.
- 1962 – University of Jordan established.
- 1963 – Amman International Stadium opens.
- 1966 – Population: 330,000.
- 1967
  - Palestinian war refugee population expands.
  - Ad-Dustour newspaper begins publication.
- 1970 – September: Conflict begins between Jordanian Armed Forces and Palestine Liberation Organisation.
- 1974 – Population: 598,000 (approximate).
- 1975 – The Jordan Times newspaper begins publication.
- 1981 – Jordan Rally (automotive race) begins.
- 1983 – Queen Alia International Airport built.
- 1985 – Population: 812,500 (estimate).
- 1989
  - Ali Suheimat becomes mayor.
  - King Abdullah I Mosque and Kan Zaman Tourist Village constructed.
- 1991 – Palestinian war refugee population expands.
- 1993 – Jordan Hospital and Jubilee School established.
- 1994 – Arab Medical Center in business.
- 1997 – Amanat 'Amman al-Kubra (city hall) built.
- 1998 – King Abdullah Stadium opens.
- 1999 – Amman Stock Exchange founded.
- 2000 – Al-Hussein Cultural Center inaugurated.

== 21st century ==
- 2001 – Jordan Media City established.
- 2002
  - Broadcasting of Arab Radio and Television Network relocated to Amman.
  - City designated an Arab Capital of Culture.
- 2003
  - Alghad newspaper begins publication.
  - Iraqi war refugee population expands.
  - Mecca Mall opens.
  - Le Royal Hotel built.
  - Raghadan Flagpole in use.
- 2004 – Al Ghad newspaper begins publication.
- 2005
  - Souk Jara begins in Jabal Amman.
  - 9 November: Hotel bombings.
- 2006
  - Omar Maani becomes mayor.
  - Abdoun Bridge and King Hussein Ben Talal Mosque built.
  - City Mall opens.
- 2007 – Children's Museum established.
- 2008
  - Amman Stand-up Comedy Festival begins.
  - Rainbow Street renovated.
- 2010 – Population: 1,919,000.
- 2011
  - Protests.
  - Abdul Halim Al Kilani becomes mayor.
- 2012
  - Prophet Mohammad Museum opens.
  - TAJ Lifestyle Center opens
- 2015 – 9 November: Amman shooting attack.
- 2018 – June: Economic protests.

== See also ==
- Amman Governorate
- Greater Amman Municipality
- List of universities in Amman
- Timeline of the Hashemite Kingdom of Jordan

== Bibliography ==
Published in 19th century

- Jedidiah Morse; Richard C. Morse (1823), "Ammon", A New Universal Gazetteer (4th ed.), New Haven: S. Converse
- "Rabbath-Ammon", Handbook for Travellers in Syria and Palestine, London: J. Murray, 1858, OCLC 2300777
- "Amman", Palestine and Syria, Leipsig: Karl Baedeker, 1876. 1898 ed.
- "Rabbath Ammon", Cook's Tourists' Handbook for Palestine and Syria, London: T. Cook & Son, 1876
- Èmile Isambert (1881). "Amman". Itinéraire descriptif, historique et archéologique de l'Orient. Guides Joanne (in French). Vol. 3: Syrie, Palestine. Paris. hdl:2027/nyp.33433002689614.

Published in 20th century

- L. W. Jones (1969). "Rapid Population Growth in Baghdad and Amman". Middle East Journal. 23 (2): 209–215. JSTOR 4324436.
- Rebecca Miles Doan (1992). "Class Differentiation and the Informal Sector in Amman, Jordan". International Journal of Middle East Studies. 24.

Published in 21st century

- Renate Dieterich (2003). "Electrical Current and Nationalist Trends in Transjordan: Pinhas Rutenberg and the Electrification of Amman". Die Welt des Islams. 43 (1): 88–101. doi:10.1163/157006003763317795. JSTOR 20140649.
- Simone Ricca (2008), "Amman", in Michael R.T. Dumper; Bruce E. Stanley (eds.), Cities of the Middle East and North Africa, Santa Barbara, USA: ABC-CLIO
