= Baruch Osnia =

Israeli politician (1905–1994)

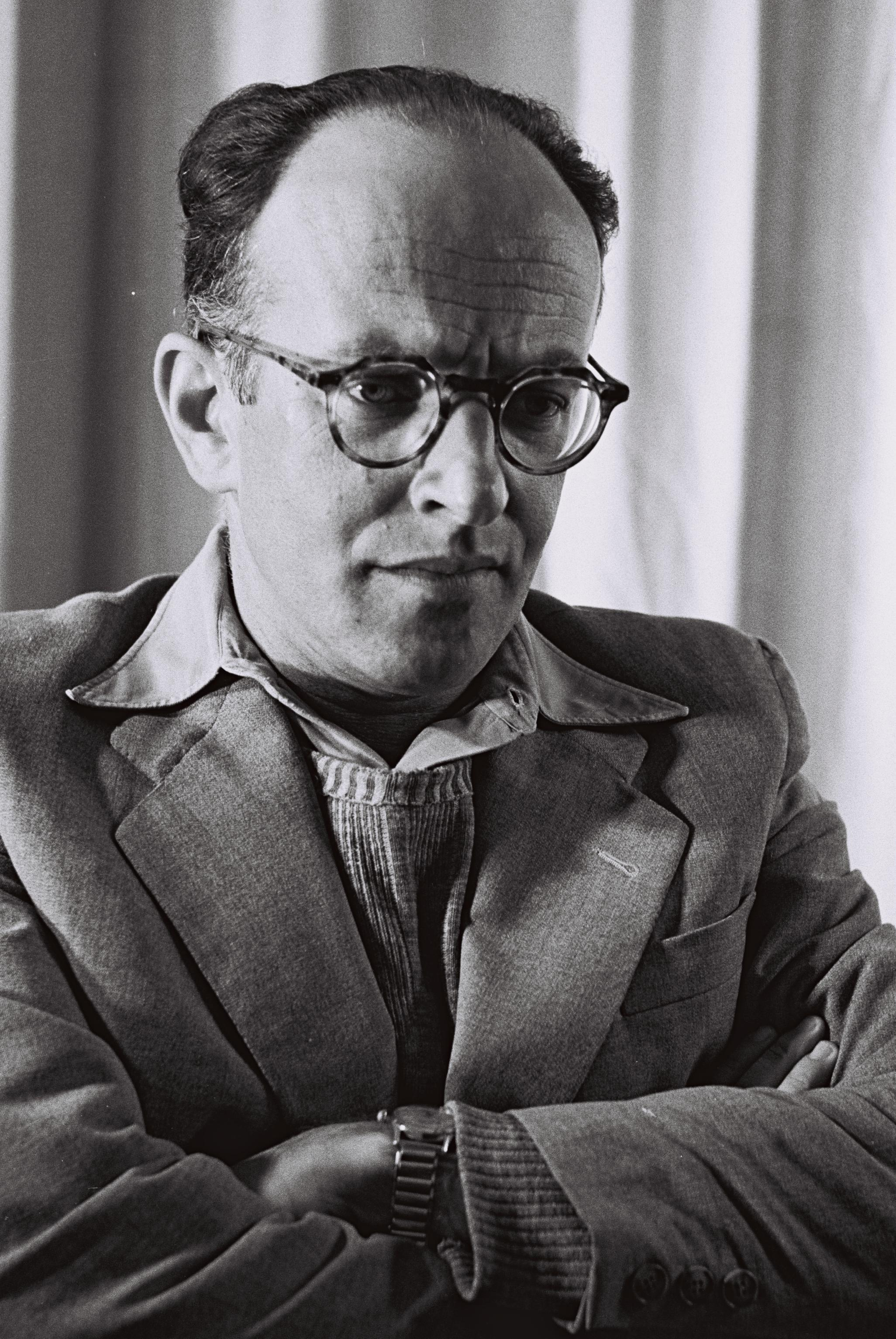

Faction represented in the Knesset
- 1951–1965: Mapai
- 1965–1968: Alignment
- 1968–1969: Labor Party
- 1969: Alignment

Personal details
- Born: 19 September 1905 Pinsk, Russian Empire
- Died: 6 July 1994 (aged 88)

Baruch Osnia (Hebrew: בָּרוּךְ אָזְנִיָּה; 19 September 1905 – 6 July 1994) was an Israeli politician who served as a member of the Knesset between 1951 and 1969.

== Biography ==
Osnia was born Baruch Eisenstadt in Pinsk in the Russian Empire (now in Belarus) to Samuel Eisenstadt and Zipora Finfelstein. He was educated at a heder and a high school in Danzig (now Gdańsk), before studying at the University of Königsberg. He returned to Danzig to work as a lawyer and was a member of Habonim. In 1929, he became secretary of the central committee of the German branch of Poale Zion.

In 1933 Osnia emigrated to Mandatory Palestine and was a high school teacher in kibbutz Givat Haim. He was on the Mapai list for the 1949 elections, but did not win a seat. However, he entered the Knesset on 12 February 1951 as a replacement for Abba Hushi, who had resigned. He retained his seat in the July 1951 elections, and was re-elected in 1955, 1959, 1961 and 1965, by which time Mapai had formed the Alignment alliance. He lost his seat in the 1969 elections.

He died in 1994.
