= 2023 in Jordan =

- Decades: 2000s; 2010s; 2020s
- See also: Other events of 2023; Timeline of Jordanian history

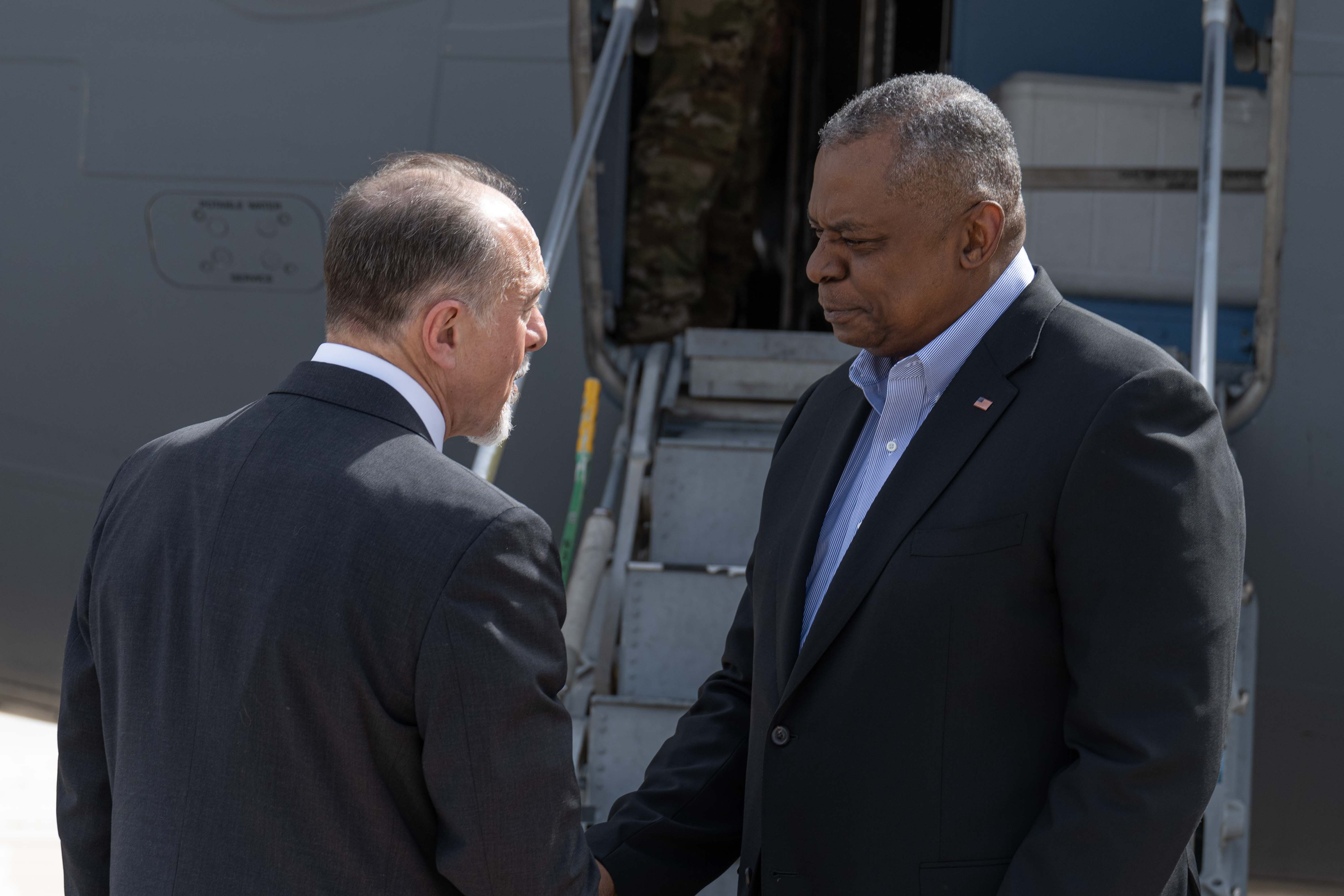
Secretary of Defense Lloyd J. Austin III is greeted by U.S. Ambassador to Jordan Henry T. Wooster following his arrival to Amman, Jordan, March 5, 2023.

Events in the year 2023 in Jordan.

== Incumbents ==
- Monarch – Abdullah II
- Prime Minister – Bisher Al-Khasawneh

== Events ==
- 1 June – Wedding of Hussein, Crown Prince of Jordan, and Rajwa Al Saif
- 1 November – Jordan recalls its ambassador to Israel to condemn the war.
- 3 November – Protesters gather in Amman to call for King Abdullah II to press for a ceasefire in the Gaza war.
- 5 November – The Royal Jordanian Air Force airdrops medical aid to a field hospital inside the Gaza Strip.
- 12 December – Several drug dealers and a soldier are killed during a shootout at Jordan's border with Syria.

== Deaths ==
- 3 January – Abdelsalam Majali, 97, Jordanian physician and politician, prime minister (1993–1995, 1997–1998).
