= Independence Day (Jordan) =

Jordan independence day

Independence day
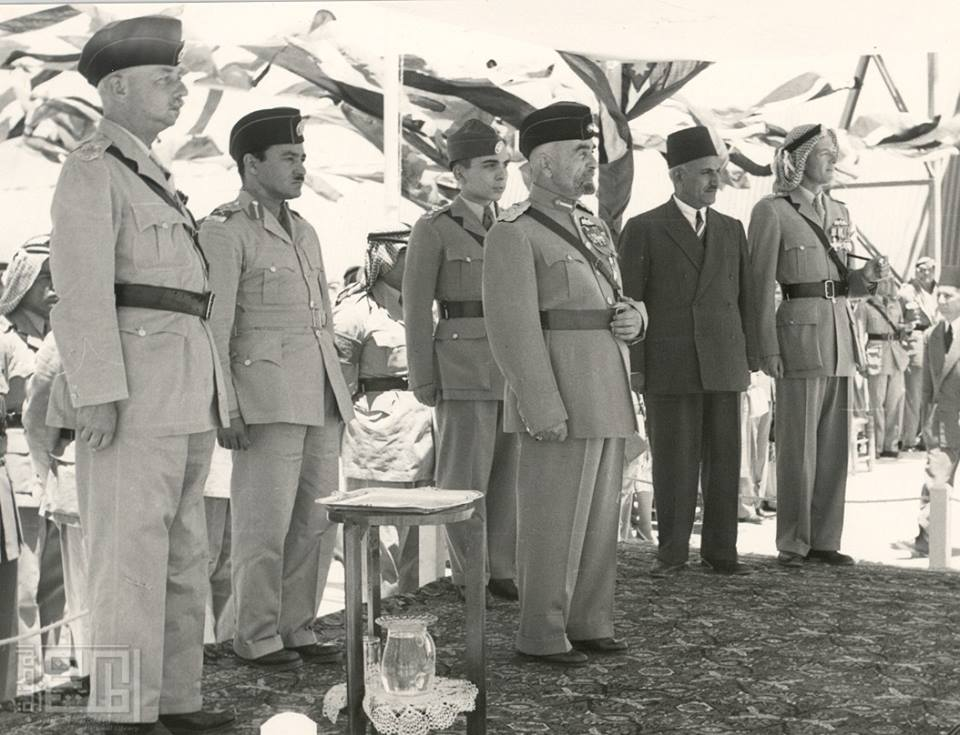
- Abdullah I on Independence Day, May 25, 1946. He is accompanied by his grandson Hussein behind him.
- Official name: Eid Al-Istiqlal
- Observed by: Jordan
- Liturgical color
- Celebrations: National and local observances
- Observances: Fireworks; 21-gun salutes; Military parades; Royal events; Awards ceremonies
- Date: 25 May
- Next time: 25 May 2027
- Frequency: Annual
- Related to: History of Jordan

Independence Day (Arabic: عيد الاستقلال, romanized: ʿīd al-istiqlāli) is an event in Jordan marking its 1946 independence from the United Kingdom.

Following the Great Arab Revolt during World War I, the Ottoman Empire which included modern-day Jordan was partitioned by Britain and France, leading to the establishment of the Emirate of Transjordan as a British protectorate in 1921 by the Hashemite Emir Abdullah.

Following World War II, the Jordanian and British governments entered into negotiations for Jordan’s independence, which were finalized in the Treaty of London in 1946. The arrangement transformed the emirate into a kingdom, which became officially known as the Hashemite Kingdom of Jordan.

Jordan became a full member of the United Nations in December 1955.

The holiday, held annually on 25 May, is usually marked with official ceremonies attended by members of the House of Hashim, as well as civil and military officials. Award presentations, political speeches and diplomatic visits are commonplace on the holiday. In the Jordanian Armed Forces, Presentation of Colours ceremonies and national/unit military parades are common during the day, as well as a 21-gun salute in the capital. On the civilian level, festive events and activities including a fireworks display.

== See also ==
- Public holidays in Jordan
- History of Jordan
- Timeline of the Hashemite Kingdom of Jordan
