= Saleh Rusheidat =

Jordanian politician (1946–2026)

- صالح ارشيدات

Member of the House of Representatives of Jordan
- In office 1993–1997

Member of the Senate of Jordan
- In office 2009–2026

Personal details
- Born: 1 January 1946 Irbid, Jordan
- Died: 2 January 2026 (aged 80)

Saleh Rusheidat (Arabic: صالح ارشيدات; 1 January 1946 – 2 January 2026) was a Jordanian politician. He served in the House of Representatives of Jordan from 1993 to 1997 and in the Senate of Jordan from 2009 to 2026.

Rusheidat died on 2 January 2026, at the age of 80.
