= 1918 in British-administered Palestine =

«««
←1918
»»»
1919
1920
1921
See also:
1918 in the United Kingdom
Other events of 1918

Events in the year 1918 in British-administered Palestine (British-controlled part of OETA territory).

== Events ==
=== February ===
10 February – The British issued the first postal stamps in Palestine, marking the end of free postal service for international mail. Additionally, discussions began about the future administration of Palestine following the war, eventually leading to the British Mandate.

=== April ===
- 4 April – The first edition of the Hebrew-language daily newspaper "Haaretz" is published, sponsored by the British military government in Palestine.
- 14 April – The Zionist Commission arrives in Palestine.

=== May ===
- 8 May – First Muslim-Christian Association meets in Jaffa.

=== June ===
- June – First meeting between the Zionist leader Chaim Weizmann and the son of the Sharif of Mecca Hashemite Prince Faisal, who led the Arab forces in the Arab Revolt against the Ottoman Empire during the First World War, which takes place in Faisal's headquarters in Aqaba in an attempt to establish favourable relations between Arabs and Jews in the Middle East.

=== July ===
- 24 July – Laying of the cornerstone of the Hebrew University of Jerusalem.

=== September ===
- 19 September – 1 October 1918 - Sinai and Palestine Campaign: Battle of Megiddo.
- 23 September – Sinai and Palestine Campaign: British occupation of Haifa is completed.

=== October ===
- 30 October – Sinai and Palestine Campaign: the British Palestine campaign officially ends with the signing of the Armistice of Mudros and, shortly thereafter, the Ottoman Empire is dissolved.

=== November ===
- 7 November – This declaration outlined the joint goals of France and Great Britain in the region, emphasizing the liberation of the peoples and the establishment of national governments based on the free choice of the indigenous populations.

=== Full date unknown ===
- An-Najah National University is established in Nablus as An-Najah Nabulsi School.

== Notable births ==
- 4 January – Yossi Harel, Israeli military intelligence officer, pre-state Haganah member, a commander of many illegal Jewish immigrants ships headed towards Mandate Palestine, including the ship SS Exodus (died 2008).
- 30 January - Meir Meivar, Israeli politician and businessman, Haganah commander during the Civil War in Mandatory Palestine (died 2000).
- 10 October – Yigal Allon, Israeli politician, a commander of the Palmach, and a general in the IDF (died 1980).
- Full date unknown
  - Yigal Hurvitz, Israeli businessman and politician (died 1994).
  - Nimr al-Khatib, Palestinian political leader and author.(died 2010)
  - Elias Freij, Palestinian politician who served as the mayor of Bethlehem for 25 years.(died 1998)
  - Kassim Rimawi, Palestinian politician and thinker who server as prime minister of Jordan. (died 1982)

== Notable deaths ==
- On September 1918 – This climactic battle resulted in significant casualties on both sides, with Allied forces suffering 782 killed, 382 missing, and 4,179 wounded. Ottoman forces were largely destroyed or captured, with only 6,000 escaping.

=== Date Unknown ===
- Hussein al-Husayni, Palestinian politician who served as mayor of Jerusalem from 1909 to 1917.
