= 1953 in Jordan =

- Decades: 1930s; 1940s; 1950s; 1960s; 1970s
- See also: Other events of 1953; Timeline of Jordanian history

The following lists events that happened during 1953 in Jordan.

== Incumbents ==
- Monarch: Hussein
- Prime Minister: Tawfik Abu al-Huda (until 5 May), Fawzi al-Mulki (starting 5 May)

== Events ==
=== May ===
- May 2 - Hussein is crowned King of Jordan.

== See also ==
- Years in Iraq
- Years in Syria
- Years in Saudi Arabia
