= Jamil Azar =

Jordanian journalist (1937–2026)

Jamil Azar (Arabic: جميل عازر; 1937 – 3 January 2026) was a Jordanian journalist and author who worked for the BBC and Al Jazeera. He has been praised as one of the founding anchors of Al Jazeera and credited with helping shape its editorial identity. He spent decades at the BBC's Arabic Service as a news translator, presenter, and producer before joining Al Jazeera at its launch in 1996. Azar was known for his linguistic expertise and live media coverage of political and security events in the Middle East, and was widely mourned by media institutions and journalists following his death.

== Early life and career ==
Jamil Azar was born in 1937 at the English Hospital in Nazareth, Palestine, to a Protestant family from Al-Husn, Jordan, in the Irbid Governorate. He obtained a diploma in Political Science and a diploma in Legal Language Translation from the University of London.

He began his career as a news translator and presenter in the Arabic section of the British Broadcasting Corporation (BBC) from 1965 to 1975. Between 1976 and 1984, he served as an English news editor, news translator, and presenter of news and current affairs programs. He later became the chief director of the News Department and subsequently assistant to the Head of the News Department. From 1986 to 1988, he produced programs such as Politics Between Questioner and Answerer and Arab Affairs in the British Press. Between 1988 and 1990, he was assistant to the Head of the BBC Arabic Section. He concluded his career at the BBC as director and presenter of programs including Trade and Industry and the weekly British Press Review, remaining in this role until 1994.

== Death ==
Jamil Azar died in London on 3 January 2026, at the age of 89. His death was mourned by numerous media institutions and journalists.
