= Avraham Biton =

Israeli politician (1923–2005)

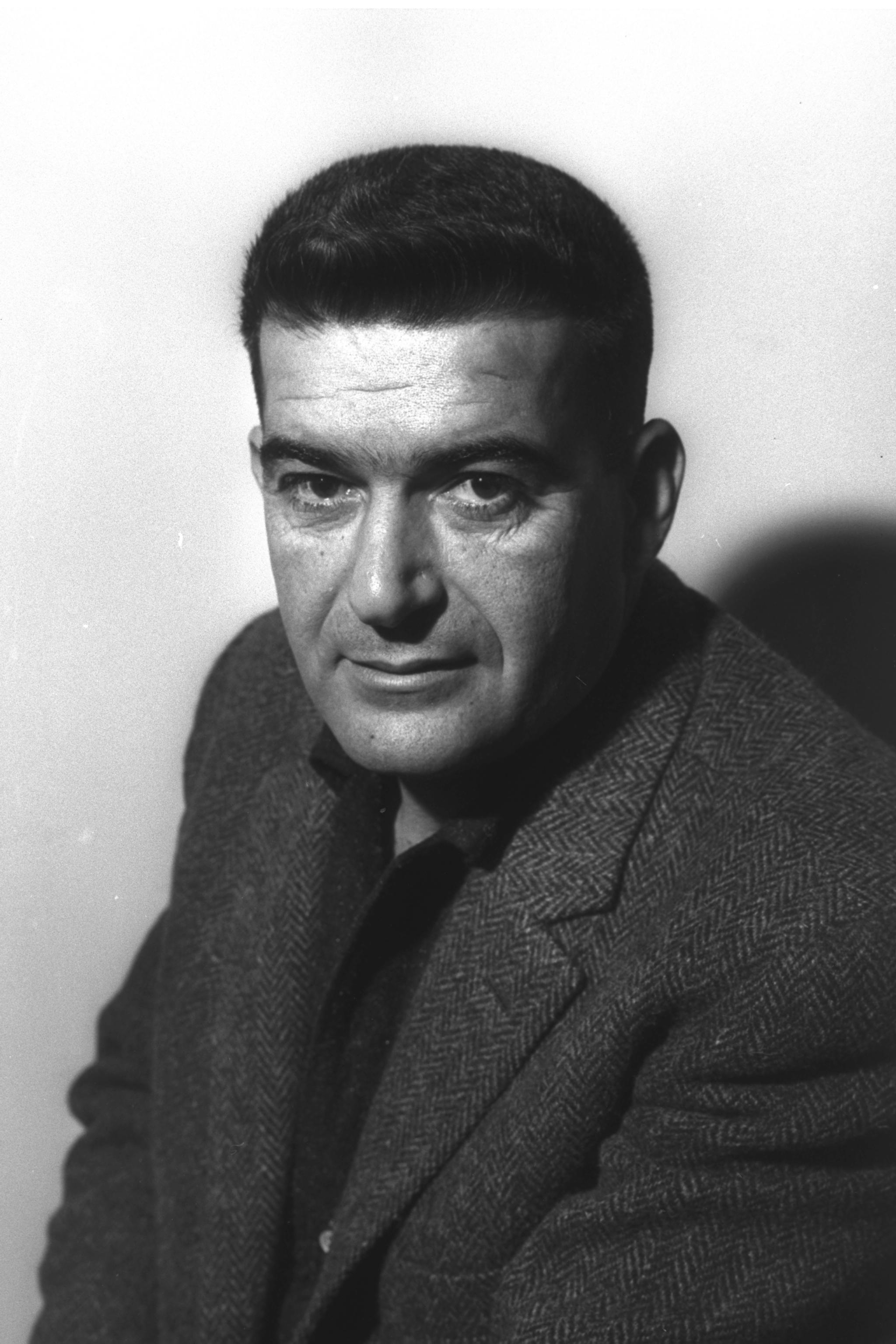
- Biton in 1966

Faction represented in the Knesset
- 1965–1968: Alignment
- 1968–1969: Labor Party
- 1969: Alignment

Personal details
- Born: 21 February 1923; Mandatory Palestine
- Died: 18 February 2005 (aged 81)

Avraham Biton (Hebrew: אברהם ביטון; 21 February 1923 – 18 February 2005) was an Israeli politician who served as a member of the Knesset for the Alignment and Labor Party between 1965 and 1969.

== Biography ==
Born in Mandatory Palestine in 1923, Biton joined the Haganah at the age of 16, and later commanded a platoon in the Hish. During the 1948 Arab–Israeli War he commanded a company in the Givati Brigade, and was later demobilised from the IDF as a major.

In 1947 he had begun working at the Palestine Electricity Corporation (which was to become the Israel Electric Corporation) and later became chairman of its national secretariat. In 1965 he was elected to the Knesset on the Alignment list, but lost his seat in the 1969 elections. He died in 2005 at the age of 81.
