= 1949 in Jordan =

- Decades: 1920s; 1930s; 1940s; 1950s; 1960s
- See also: Other events of 1949; Timeline of Jordanian history

The following lists events that happened during 1949 in Jordan.

== Incumbents ==
- Monarch: Abdullah I
- Prime Minister: Tawfik Abu al-Huda

== Events ==
=== June ===
- June 2 - Transjordan becomes the Kingdom of Jordan.

=== September ===
- September 13 - The Soviet Union vetoes United Nations membership for Ceylon, Finland, Iceland, Italy, Jordan and Portugal.

== See also ==
- Years in Iraq
- Years in Syria
- Years in Saudi Arabia
