= 1921 in Mandatory Palestine =

- 1921 in British-administered Palestine
«««
1920
1919
1918
»»»
1922
1923
1924
See also:
1921 in the United Kingdom

Events in the year 1921 in the British Mandate of Palestine.

== Incumbents ==
- High Commissioner – Sir Herbert Louis Samuel
- Emir of Transjordan – Abdullah I bin al-Hussein from 11 April
- Prime Minister of Transjordan – Rashid Tali’a from 11 April until 15 August; Mazhar Raslan

== Events ==
=== March ===
- 12 March – Start of Cairo Conference which agrees that the administration of Transjordan should be separated from that of Palestine.

=== April ===
- 11 April – The establishment of the Emirate of Transjordan.

=== May ===
- 1-7 May – Jaffa riots: Riots in Jaffa result in the death of 47 Jews (including the author Yosef Haim Brenner) and 48 Arabs.

=== June ===
- 25 June – Fourth Palestine Arab Congress held in Jerusalem.

=== October ===
- October – The Haycraft Commission of Inquiry publishes its findings on the Jaffa riots of the previous year.

=== Unknown dates ===
- The founding of the Hebrew Writers Association in the Land of Israel by Hayim Nahman Bialik.
- The founding of the kibbutz Tel Yosef by members of Gdud HaAvoda, named after Joseph Trumpeldor.
- The founding of the kibbutz Ein Harod by pioneers of the Third Aliyah.
- The founding of the moshav Nahalal by pioneers of the Second Aliyah and Third Aliyah.
- The founding of the moshava Ir Ganim (Today Ramat Gan).

== Notable births ==
- 1 January – Ismail al-Faruqi, Palestinian-American philosopher and scholar (died 1986)
- 6 January – Haim Corfu, Israeli politician (died 2015)
- 16 January – Shmuel Toledano, Israeli politician and Mossad officer (died 2022)
- 17 January – Dan Tolkowsky, Israeli military officer, commander of the Israeli Air Force, and venture capitalist (died 2025)
- 17 January – Modi Alon, Israeli fighter pilot who commanded Israel's first fighter squadron, scored the first aerial victory of the Israeli Air Force (died 1948)
- 17 March – Meir Amit, Israeli politician, general, and intelligence officer (died 2009)
- 18 March – Joseph Tabenkin, Israeli military commander (died 1987)
- 21 March – Amin al-Majaj, Palestinian politician who served as mayor of Jerusalem (died 1999)
- 9 April – Yitzhak Navon, Fifth President of Israel (died 2015)
- 26 August – Shimshon Amitsur, Israeli mathematician (died 1994)
- 15 September – Moshe Shamir, Israeli author, playwright, opinion writer, and public figure (died 2004)
- 21 September – Yehoshafat Harkabi, Israeli military intelligence officer and Professor of International Relations (died 1994)
- 18 November – Baruch Ben Haim, Sephardic rabbi, Chief Rabbi of the Syrian Jewish community in Brooklyn for 55 years (died 2005)
- 2 October – Yisrael Peled, Israeli politician, second Mayor of Ramat Gan (died 2016)

=== Full date unknown ===
- Burhan Dajani, Palestinian academic and economist (died 2000)
- Wajih Al Madani, Palestinian military commander (died 1991)
- Amos Hakham, Israeli Bible scholar (died 2012)
- Arie Machnes, Israeli footballer (died 2008)

== Notable deaths ==
- 31 March – Kamil al-Husayni, Palestinian religious leader and grand Mufti of Jerusalem.(Born 1867)
- 2 May – Yosef Haim Brenner (born 1881), Russian-born Palestinian Jew. Hebrew-language author, one of the pioneers of modern Hebrew literature
- 5 May – Avshalom Gissin (born 1896), Zionist activist and Ottoman Army veteran killed defending Petah Tikva during the 1921 Palestine riots
