= 2024 in Jordan =

- Decades: 2000s; 2010s; 2020s
- See also: Other events of 2024; Timeline of Jordanian history

Events in the year 2024 in Jordan.

== Incumbents ==
- Monarch – Abdullah II
- Prime Minister – Bisher Al-Khasawneh
  - Jafar Hassan (From 15 September)

== Events ==
- 28 January – Tower 22 drone attack: Three U.S. military personnel are killed in a drone attack by the Islamic Resistance in Iraq, an Iranian-backed militia group, on a US military outpost near the Syrian border.
- 18 June – The Jordanian Foreign Ministry confirms that 41 Jordanian pilgrims died due to heat exhaustion during the Hajj in Mecca.
- 26 July – 11 August: Jordan at the 2024 Summer Olympics
- 26 July – The village of Umm el-Jimal is designated as a World Heritage Site by UNESCO.
- 10 September: 2024 Jordanian general election: The Islamic Action Front emerges as the largest single party in the House of Representatives but fails to secure a majority, winning 31 out of 138 seats.
- 12 September – The United Kingdom suspends visa-exempt status for Jordanian nationals traveling to the UK due to the rise in asylum claims from Jordanians.
- 15 September – Bisher Khasawneh resigns as prime minister. In response, King Abdullah II nominates his chief of staff, Jafar Hassan, to form a new government.
- 24 November – Three police officers are injured in a shooting near the Israeli embassy in the Rabiah neighborhood of Amman. The gunman is shot dead by police.
- 6 December – Syrian civil war: Jordan closes the border with Syria after rebel forces in Syria seize the main Nasib Border Crossing.
- 13 December – A fire at a private elderly care centre in Amman kills six people and injures five others.

== Deaths ==
- 12 August – Zaid Rifai (b. 1936), Prime Minister (1973-1976, 1984-1989) and President of the Senate (1997-2009).
