= Timeline of the Hashemite Kingdom of Jordan =

History of the state of Jordan

This is a timeline of major events in the history of the modern state of Jordan.

== Partitioning of the Ottoman Empire ==
Hejaz Vilayet in 1908

Syria Vilayet in 1908

The two Ottoman vilayets into which today's Jordan was split
- May 1916: Anticipating the Allied defeat of the Ottoman Empire, Britain and France made the Sykes–Picot Agreement, which divided Ottoman territory into future spheres of influence: French in Syria, British in Palestine and Mesopotamia. The Agreement defined the border between these zones. At the time, the area which is today Jordan was part of the Hejaz vilayet and the Syria vilayet.
- June 1916: Hussein bin Ali, Sharif of Mecca allied with the Britain and France against the Ottomans sometime around 8 June 1916, the actual date being somewhat uncertain. This alliance began the Arab Revolt. Hussein then declared himself King of Hejaz.
- July 1917: Arab forces led by Auda Abu Tayi and T. E. Lawrence defeated Ottoman forces in the Battle of Aqaba – the primary military success of the Hashemite forces in the Arab Revolt.
- April-May 1918: Ottoman forces defeated Arab forces in the First Battle of the Jordan and Second Battle of the Jordan.
- September-October 1918: British forces defeated the Ottomans at Megiddo. Arab forces captured Amman, Deraa, and Damascus.
- October 1918: The Ottoman Empire signed the Armistice of Mudros, ending the Middle Eastern theatre of World War I. Arabs formed a provisional government in Syria headed by Faisal, the leader of the Arab revolt and third son of Hussein bin Ali. The area which became Trans-Jordan was split between the southern extension of Syria and the northern extension of Hejaz.
- March 1920: I Faisal proclaimed himself King of Syria

=== Mandate for Palestine ===
- April 1920: The San Remo conference formally outlined the proposed French Mandate for Syria and the Lebanon and British Mandate for Palestine along the lines of the Sykes–Picot Agreement. The border between British and French zones separated northern Trans-Jordan from Syria; however the conference made no explicit mention of Trans-Jordan.
- July 1920: French forces defeated Arabs at the Battle of Maysalun, captured Damascus, and expelled Faisal. His brother Abdullah moved his forces into Ma'an (then in the north of the Kingdom of Hejaz) with a view to retaking Damascus. Herbert Samuel was appointed British High Commissioner for Palestine.
- August 1920: Samuel made a speech at Salt, for which he was reprimanded by British Foreign Secretary Curzon.
- October 1920: High Commissioner Samuel ordered Captain Frederick Peake to form an Arab security force of 150 men. This force developed into the Arab Legion.

== Emirate and Mandate period ==
=== Emirate of Trans-Jordan | Mandate for Palestine ===
- 1921: In March, the Cairo Conference (1921) agrees to award the Emirate of Trans-Jordan to Abdullah and the mandate of Mesopotamia to Faisal During the conference, Winston Churchill convinced Abdullah to stay put and not attack the French because that would threaten his throne in Transjordan since the French had military superiority over his forces.
- 1922: The Council of the League of Nations accepts the British Transjordan memorandum defining the limits of Trans-Jordan and excluding that territory from the provisions in the Mandate concerning the Jewish national home.

=== Emirate of Trans-Jordan | Trans-Jordan memorandum ===
- 1922: British Government passes the Order defining Boundaries of Territory to which the Palestine Order-in-Council does not applyl see Trans-Jordan memorandum
- 1923: Britain recognises Transjordan with Abdullah as its leader
- 1923: Frederick Peake's "Mobile Force" becomes Al Jeish al Arabi (the Arab Army), known in English as the Arab Legion
- 1925: Hadda Agreement between TransJordan and Nejd formally agrees the boundary between the two countries following the Kuwait Conference. The agreement concludes by stating "This Agreement will remain in force for so long as His Britannic Majesty's Government are entrusted with the Mandate for Trans-Jordan"

== Post-Mandate period ==
Hashemite Kingdom of Transjordan

- 1946: Britain ends its mandate over Transjordan, granting full independence to the Kingdom
- 1947: Dead Sea Scrolls discovered
- 1947–48: Thousands of Palestinians flee Arab–Israeli fighting to West Bank and Jordan
- 1948–49: 1948 Arab–Israeli War concludes with the armistice agreements. The territory of the Mandatory Palestine is divided between Israel, Jordan (changed from Transjordan) and Egypt

Hashemite Kingdom of Jordan

== Post 1948 war ==
Image showing the approximate land exchanged between Jordan (gaining green) and Saudi Arabia (gaining red)

- 1951: Riad as-Solh, former Lebanese prime minister, was assassinated in Amman by member of the Syrian Nationalist Party.
- 1951: King Abdullah I of Jordan was assassinated in Jerusalem by a Palestinian after rumors circulating about his intent to sign a peace treaty with Israel. Talal is proclaimed king after his father.
- 1952: Constitution of Jordan established. Talal abdicates the throne due to illness.
- 1955: Wide scale violent anti-Hashemite riots across Jordan result in resignation of the Majali government and retraction of Jordan from the Baghdad Pact. An anti-Christian riot also takes place in Madaba the same year.
- 1956: King Hussein sacks the British personnel in the Jordanian army, an act of Arabization to ensure the complete soveireginty of Jordan.
- 1957: 1957 alleged Jordanian military coup attempt.
- 1958: Arab Federation of Iraq and Jordan created in February, shortly before the creation of United Arab Republic between Egypt and Syria. It was disestablished following the 14 July Revolution in Iraq.
- 1965: Jordan and Saudi Arabia concluded a bilateral agreement that realigned and delimited the boundary, resulting in some exchange of territory, allowing Jordan to expand its port facilities at Aqaba and protecting the pasturage and watering rights of certain nomadic tribes.
- 1967: Six-Day War

== Post 1967 war ==
- 1968: Battle of Karameh between the Israel Defense Forces (IDF) and combined forces of the Palestine Liberation Organization (PLO) and the Jordanian Army.
- 1970: Black September. The PLO were driven out to Lebanon.
- 1973: Yom Kippur War
- 1994: Israel–Jordan Treaty of Peace
- 1999: King Abdullah bin Al Hussein became the 4th king of The Hashemite Kingdom of Jordan.
- 2005: 2005 Amman bombings by Al-Qaeda leader Abu Musab Al-Zarqawi.
- 2010: 2011–12 Jordanian protests breaks out as part of the Arab Spring demanding economic and political reforms.
- 2014: Jordanian intervention in the Syrian Civil War began on 22 September 2014, with air strikes on Islamic State of Iraq and the Levant (ISIL) targets, and escalated after the murder on Muath al-Kasasbeh, a captured Jordanian pilot, by ISIL, in early 2015.

== See also ==
- History of Jordan
- Timeline of Amman
