= Lists of conferences =

This is a list of lists of conferences.

== Academic or scientific ==
- List of communications-related conferences
- List of computer science conferences
- List of distributed computing conferences
- List of free software events
- List of human genetics conferences
- List of IEEE conferences
- List of physics conferences
- List of systems biology conferences

== Athletic or sports ==
- List of college athletic conferences in the United States
- List of defunct college football conferences
- List of NAIA conferences
- List of NCAA conferences

== Humanities, arts, or society ==
- List of Allied World War II conferences
- List of Axis World War II conferences
- List of bisexuality-related organizations and conferences
- List of LGBT-related organizations and conferences
- List of linguistics conferences
- List of model United Nations conferences
- List of skeptical conferences
- List of writers' conferences
- List of women's conferences

== By location ==
- List of conferences in Cairo
- List of conferences in London

== See also ==
- Category:Conferences
- Category:Events
