= Borders of Israel =

Political boundaries between Israel and neighboring states

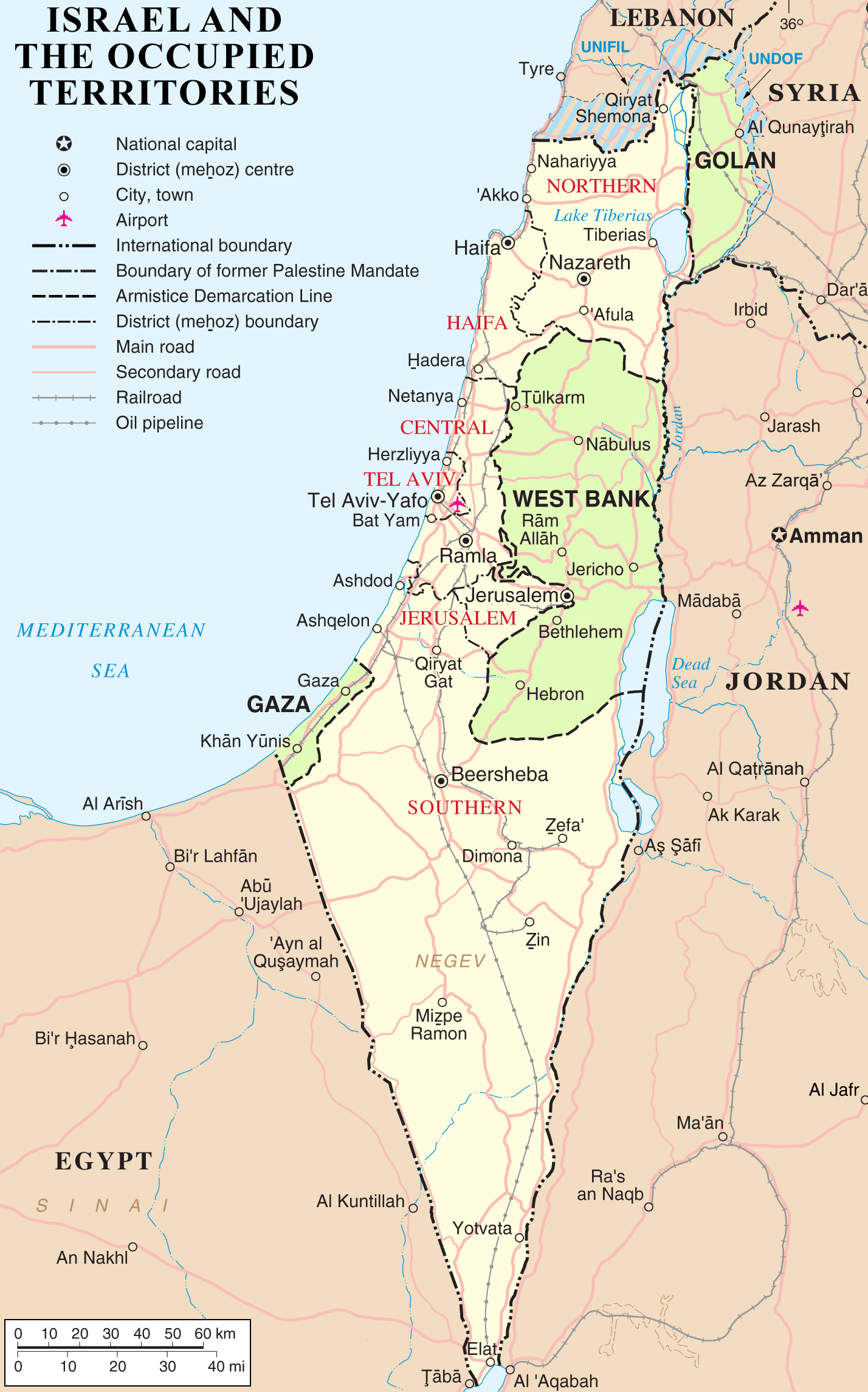
Map 1: United Nations-derived boundary map of Israel and the Israeli-occupied territories (2007, updated to 2018)

The borders of Israel exist as the result both of past wars and of diplomatic agreements between the State of Israel and its neighbours, as well as an effect of the agreements among colonial powers ruling in the region before Israel's creation. The 1949 Armistice Agreements following the 1948 Palestine war established the Green Line, the first internationally recognized borders of Israel. In the 1967 Arab–Israeli War, Israel began an occupation of the Sinai, the Gaza Strip, East Jerusalem, the West Bank, and the Golan Heights; only two of Israel's five total potential land borders are internationally recognized and uncontested, while the other three remain disputed. Israel's two formally recognized and confirmed borders exist with Egypt and Jordan since the 1979 Egypt–Israel peace treaty and the 1994 Israel–Jordan peace treaty, while its borders with Syria (via the Israeli-occupied Golan Heights), Lebanon (via the Blue Line; see Shebaa Farms dispute) and the Palestinian territories (Israeli-occupied land largely recognized as part of the State of Palestine) remain internationally defined as contested.

According to the Green Line of 1949, Israel is demarcated by Lebanon to the north, the Golan Heights under Syrian sovereignty as well as the rest of Syria to the northeast, the Palestinian West Bank and Jordan to the east, and by the Palestinian Gaza Strip and Egypt to the southwest. The Israeli border with Egypt is the international border demarcated in 1906 between the United Kingdom and the Ottoman Empire, and confirmed in the 1979 Egypt–Israel peace treaty; the Israeli border with Jordan is based on the border defined in the 1922 Trans-Jordan memorandum, and confirmed in the 1994 Israel–Jordan peace treaty.

== Early background ==
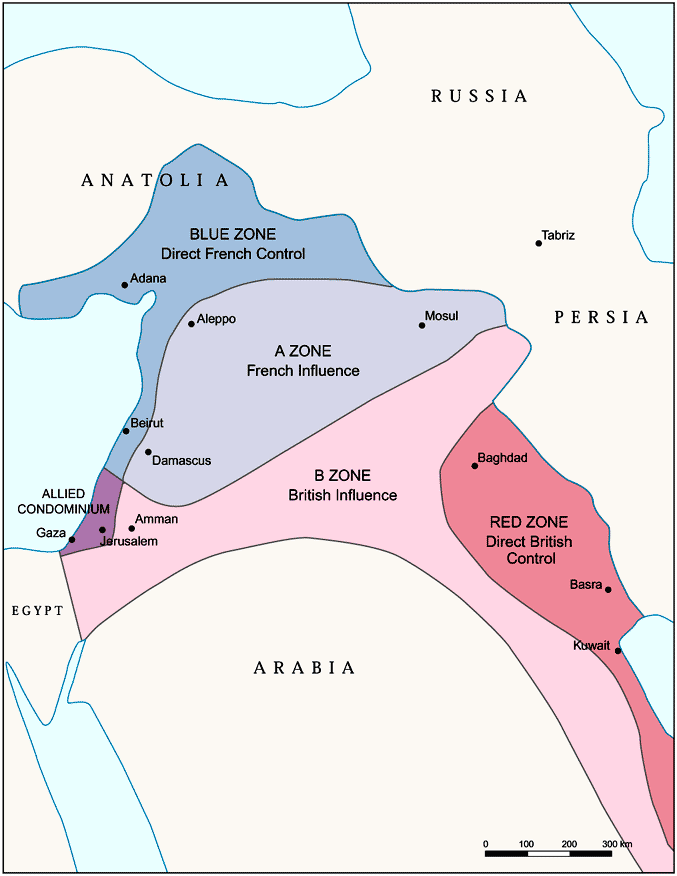
Map 2: Zones of French and British influence and control proposed in the 1916 Sykes–Picot Agreement during World War I

The Sykes–Picot Agreement of 1916 secretly divided the Ottoman Empire lands of Middle East between British and French spheres of influence. They agreed that "Palestine" was to be designated as an "international enclave". This agreement was revised by Britain and France in December 1918; it was agreed that Palestine and the Vilayet of Mosul in modern-day Iraq would be part of the British sphere in exchange for British support of French influence in Syria and Lebanon. At the San Remo Conference (April 19–26, 1920) the Allied Supreme Council determined that mandates for Palestine and Mesopotamia would be allocated to Britain without precisely defining the boundaries of the mandated territories.

== Border with Jordan ==
=== British Mandate ===
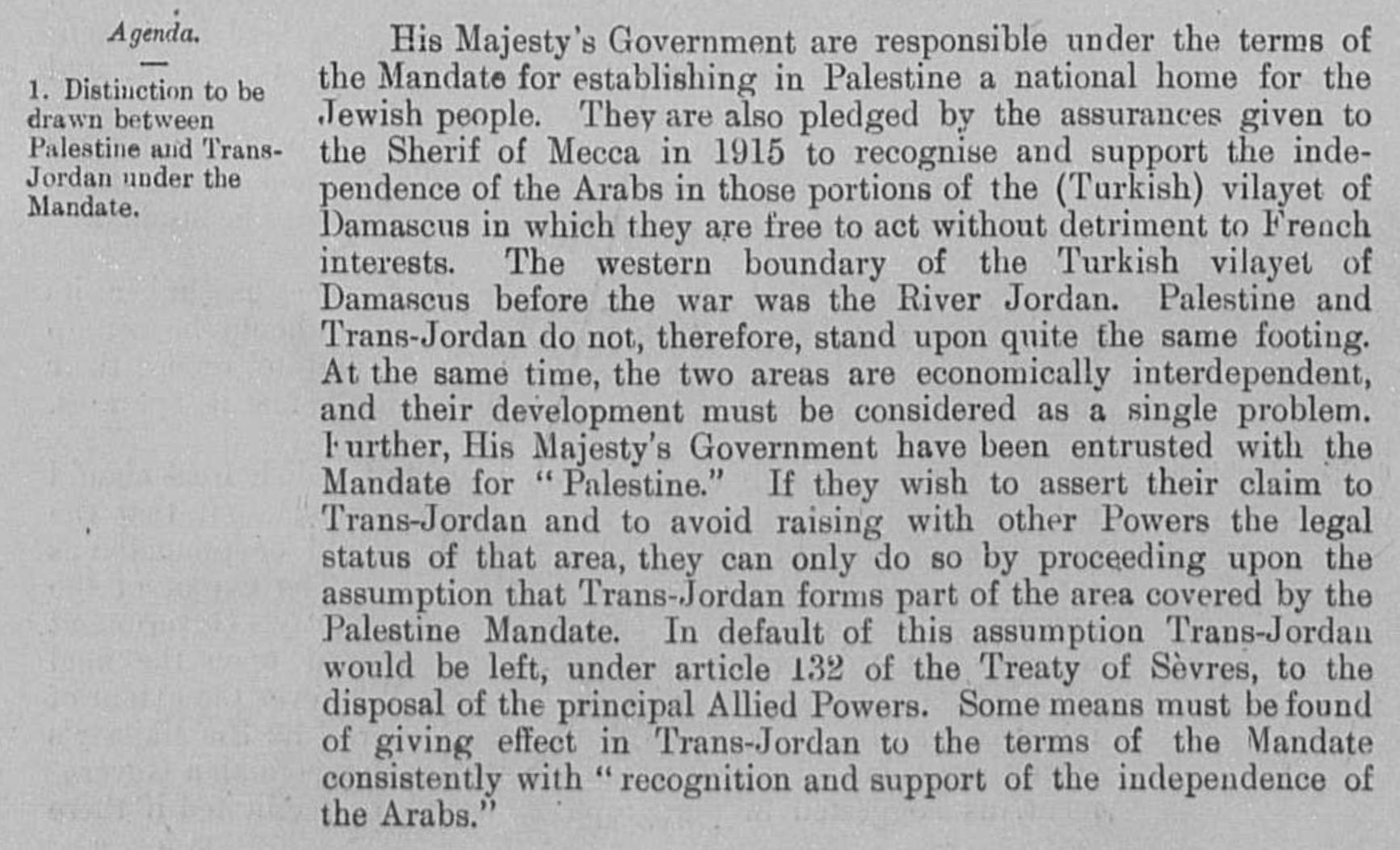
March 12, 1921, British memorandum explaining the situation of Transjordan: "His Majesty's Government have been entrusted with the Mandate for "Palestine." If they wish to assert their claim to Trans-Jordan and to avoid raising with other Powers the legal status of that area, they can only do so by proceeding upon the assumption that Trans-Jordan forms part of the area covered by the Palestine Mandate. In default of this assumption Trans-Jordan would be left, under article 132 of the Treaty of Sèvres, to the disposal of the principal Allied Powers."

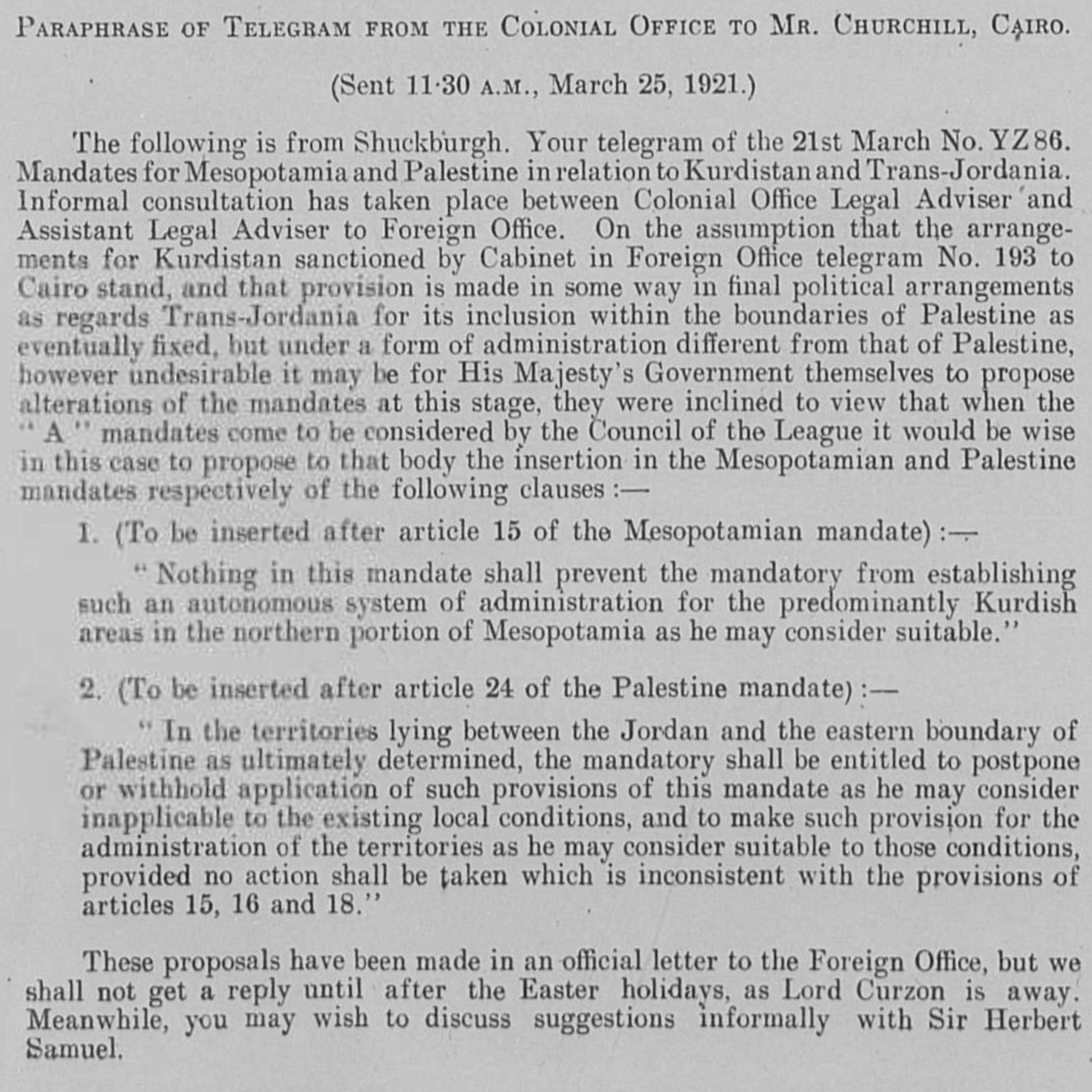
March 25, 1921, proposal, approved a week later, to include Transjordan via Article 25: "On the assumption that... provision is made in some way in final political arrangements as regards Trans-Jordania for its inclusion within the boundaries of Palestine as eventually fixed, but under a form of administration different from that of Palestine, however undesirable it may be for His Majesty's Government themselves to propose alterations of the mandates at this stage, they were inclined to view that when the "A" mandates come to be considered by the Council of the League it would be wise in this case to propose to that body the insertion... after article 24 of the Palestine mandate..." (Note: Klieman writes: "Accordingly, Churchill cabled the Colonial Office on 21 March, asking whether the Cairo proposals would necessitate any special provisions being made in the two mandates... Upon receipt of this cable informal consultation took place between the Colonial Office legal adviser and the assistant legal adviser to the Foreign Office. Their suggestion, on the 25th by Shuckburgh, was that... a clause be inserted in each of the mandates... [Footnote:] The first draft of Article 25 was originally worded "to postpone the application of such provisions," but was altered at Shuckburgh's initiative since "'postpone' means, or may be taken to mean, that we are going to apply them eventually"")

Between March 12–25, 1921, the inclusion of Transjordan in the mandate was formulated by the British Government.

In March 1921, the Colonial Secretary Winston Churchill visited Jerusalem and following a discussion with Emir Abdullah, it was agreed that Transjordan was to be added to the proposed Palestine Mandate, but that the Jewish National Home objective for the proposed Palestine Mandate would not apply to the territory.

In July 1922, the League of Nations approved the Palestine Mandate, which came into effect in 1923 after a dispute between France and Italy over the Syria Mandate was settled. The Mandate stated that Britain could 'postpone or withhold' application of the provisions dealing with the 'Jewish National Home' in the territory east of the Jordan River, then called Transjordan. In September 1922, following Abdullah's probation period, the British government presented a memorandum to the League of Nations defining the border of Transjordan and confirming its exclusion from all the provisions dealing with Jewish settlement.

Historian and political scientist Adam Garfinkle writes that the public clarification and implementation of Article 25, more than a year after its addition to the Mandate, misled some "into imagining that Transjordanian territory was covered by the conditions of the Mandate as to the Jewish National Home before August 1921". (Note: Adam Garfinkle explained, "After the Cairo Conference of March 1921, whereupon the Emirate of Transjordan was created, Article 25 pertaining to Transjordan was added to the draft Mandate – in August 1921. Article 25 notes that Transjordanian territory is not included in the Jewish National Home. This language confuses some readers into imagining that Transjordanian territory was covered by the conditions of the Mandate as to the Jewish National Home before August 1921. Not so; what became Transjordanian territory was not part of the mandate at all. As noted, it was part of the Arabian Chapter problem; it was, in other words, in a state of postwar legal and administrative limbo. And this is also not to speak of the fact that, as of August 1921, the mandates had yet to be approved or take effect.") This would, according to professor of modern Jewish history Bernard Wasserstein, result in "the myth of Palestine's 'first partition' [which became] part of the concept of 'Greater Israel' and of the ideology of Jabotinsky's Revisionist movement". (Note: Wasserstein writes: "Palestine, therefore, was not partitioned in 1921–1922. Transjordan was not excised but, on the contrary, added to the mandatory area. Zionism was barred from seeking to expand there – but the Balfour Declaration had never previously applied to the area east of the Jordan. Why is this important? Because the myth of Palestine's 'first partition' has become part of the concept of 'Greater Israel' and of the ideology of Jabotinsky's Revisionist movement.") (Note: Biger wrote, "The results of the Cairo conference were a failure for the Zionist Organization, but Britain had won itself a devoted ally east of the Jordan ... Certain Zionist politicians, and especially the circles that surrounded Ze'ev Jabutinski, regarded the British decisions and the quiet Zionist approval as treason. The call 'Two banks for the Jordan river – this one is ours and so is the other' was heard from then onward. Even the other side of the Jewish political map did not lose its faith in achieving a better political solution, and in a famous song – which was composed many years later – one can find the words 'from Metulla to the Negev, from the sea to the desert'. The allusion is clearly to the desert that lies east of the Trans-Jordanian heights and not to the Judean desert.") Palestinian-American academic Ibrahim Abu-Lughod, then chair of the Northwestern University political science department, suggested that the "Jordan as a Palestinian State" references made by Israeli spokespeople may reflect "the same [mis]understanding". (Note: Abu-Lughod, writing in 1988: "... the statement presented by Mr Herbert Samuel, the first British High Commissioner, to the League of Nations on the administration of Palestine and Transjordan between 1920–25 ... is sufficiently clear on the distinctness of Transjordan and its emergence and leaves no doubt that Palestine did not include Transjordan in prior periods ... The Zionist and later on the Israeli discourse stresses the 'fact' that Israel emerged on only a very small part of Palestine – less than a third – by which they mean the entirety of Palestine and Transjordan; hence the term 'the partitioned State' ... While Israel officially is more circumspect in its pronouncements, its official spokesmen often refer to Jordan as a Palestinian State and claim that Palestinians already therefore have a state of their own. A series of advertisements that appeared in major American newspapers in the course of 1983 claimed openly that Jordan is Palestine. The series was presumably paid for by 'private' sponsors who support Israel but have been reported to be acting on behalf of certain sectors of Israel's leadership. Though rightly discredited as spurious scholarship, Joan Peters's From Time Immemorial (1984) gave much publicity to the Zionist definition of Palestine as including Transjordan (and, throughout, her work utilizes seriously flawed data that specifically refer to 'Western Palestine'). Perhaps Israel's preference for a solution to the Palestinian-Israeli conflict in terms of what has become known as the 'Jordanian' option reflects the same understanding.")

=== Independence ===
Transjordan gained independence from Britain in 1946 within the above borders, prior to the termination of Mandatory Palestine .

On May 15, 1948, the Transjordanian Arab Legion entered from the east what had been the Palestinian part of the Palestinian Mandate, while other Arab armies invaded other parts of the territory. The 1948 Arab–Israeli War was brought to an end by the Lausanne Conference of 1949 at which the 1949 Armistice Agreements were concluded. The resulting armistice line is commonly referred to as the Green Line, and was expressly declared to be a temporary demarcation line, rather than a permanent border, and the Armistice Agreements relegated the issue of permanent borders to future negotiations. After the armistice, Transjordan was in control of what came to be called the West Bank. East Jerusalem, including the Old City, was considered part of the West Bank.

The West Bank was annexed by Jordan in 1950, with the border being the 1949 armistice line, though Jordan laid claim to all of Mandate Palestine. Jordan's annexation was only recognised by three countries. The West Bank remained part of Jordan until Israel captured it in 1967, during the Six-Day War, though Jordan continued to claim the territory as its own after that date. In July 1988, Jordan renounced all claims to the West Bank, in favour of the Palestinian Liberation Organisation, as the "sole legitimate representative of the Palestinian people".

The Israel–Jordan peace treaty, signed on October 26, 1994, resolved all outstanding territorial and border issues between the two countries that had existed since the 1948 War. The treaty specified and fully recognized the international border between Israel and Jordan, with Jordan confirming its renunciation of any claim to the West Bank. Upon its signing, the Jordan and Yarmouk Rivers, the Dead Sea, the Emek Ha'arva/Wadi Araba and the Gulf of Aqaba were officially designated as the borders between Israel and Jordan and between Jordan and the territory occupied by Israel in 1967. For the latter, the agreement requires that the demarcation use a different presentation, and that it carry the following disclaimer:

This line is the administrative boundary between Jordan and the territory which came under Israeli military government control in 1967. Any treatment of this line shall be without prejudice to the status of the territory.

== Border with Syria and Lebanon ==
=== French Mandate: Paulet–Newcombe Agreement ===
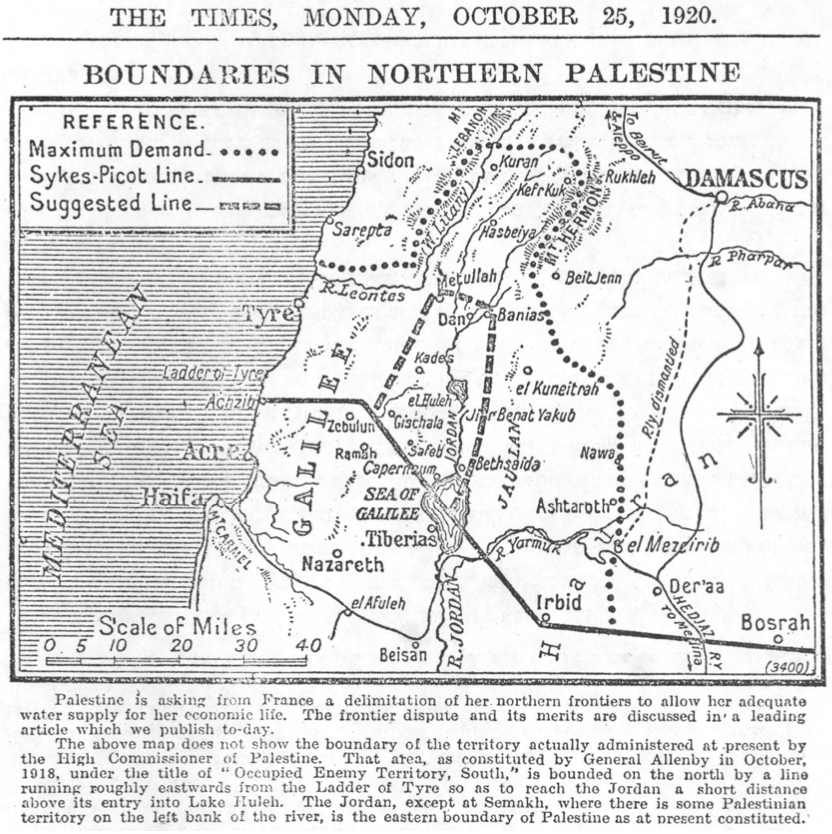
Map 3: Article from The Times, October 25, 1920, reporting on the active discussions regarding the boundary line; this was later formalised in the Paulet–Newcombe Agreement.

The Paulet–Newcombe Agreement, a series of agreements between 1920 and 1923, contained the principles for the boundary between the Mandates of Palestine and Mesopotamia, attributed to Great Britain, and the Mandate of Syria and the Lebanon, attributed to France.

A 1920 agreement defined the boundary between the forthcoming British and French mandates in broad terms, and placed the bulk of the Golan Heights in the French sphere. The agreement also established a joint commission to settle the border and mark it on the ground. The commission submitted its final report on February 3, 1922, and it was approved with some caveats by the British and French governments on March 7, 1923, several months before Britain and France assumed their Mandatory responsibilities on September 29, 1923. In this way the Golan Heights became part of the French Mandate of Syria. When the French Mandate of Syria ended in 1944, the Golan Heights remained part of the newly independent state of Syria.

Map 4: Borders in the region of the Sea of Galilee and Golan Heights, showing the Ottoman boundaries, the 1920 agreement and the 1923 agreement

In 1923, an agreement between the United Kingdom and France, known as the Paulet–Newcombe Agreement, established the border between the soon-to-be formalised territories covered by the British Mandate for Palestine and the French Mandate for Syria. The border was drawn so that both sides of the Jordan River and the whole of the Sea of Galilee, including a 10-metre-wide strip along the northeastern shore, were part of Palestine. The agreement added 227 square kilometers to the area of Palestine.

=== Syria: subsequent changes ===
The 1947 UN Partition Plan allocated this territory to the Jewish state. Following the 1948 Arab–Israeli War, Syria seized some land that had been allocated to the Jewish state and under the 1949 Armistice Agreements with Israel retained 66 square kilometers of that territory in the Jordan Valley that lay west of the 1923 Palestinian Mandate border (marked green on Map 4). These territories were designated demilitarized zones (DMZs) and remained under Syrian control (marked as DMZs on the map). It was emphasised that the armistice line was "not to be interpreted as having any relation whatsoever to ultimate territorial arrangements." (Article V)

During the Six-Day War (1967), Israel captured the territory as well as the rest of the Golan Heights, and subsequently repelled a Syrian attempt to recapture it during the Yom Kippur War (1973). Israel annexed the Golan Heights in 1981 with the Golan Heights Law. Israel began building settlements throughout the Golan Heights, and offered the Druze and Circassian residents citizenship, which most turned down. Today, Israel regards the Golan Heights as its sovereign territory, and a strategic necessity. The Purple Line marks the boundary between Israel and Syria. Israel's unilateral annexation has not been internationally recognized, and United Nations Security Council Resolution 242 refers to the area as Israeli-occupied.

During the 1990s, there were constant negotiations between Israel and Syria regarding a mediation of conflicts and an Israeli withdrawal from the Golan Heights but a peace treaty did not come to fruition. The main stumbling block seems to involve the 66 square kilometers of territory that Syria retained under the 1949 armistice agreement. Arab countries support Syria's position in the formula which calls on Israel to return to the 1967 borders. (See 2002 Arab Peace Initiative)

=== Lebanon conflict ===
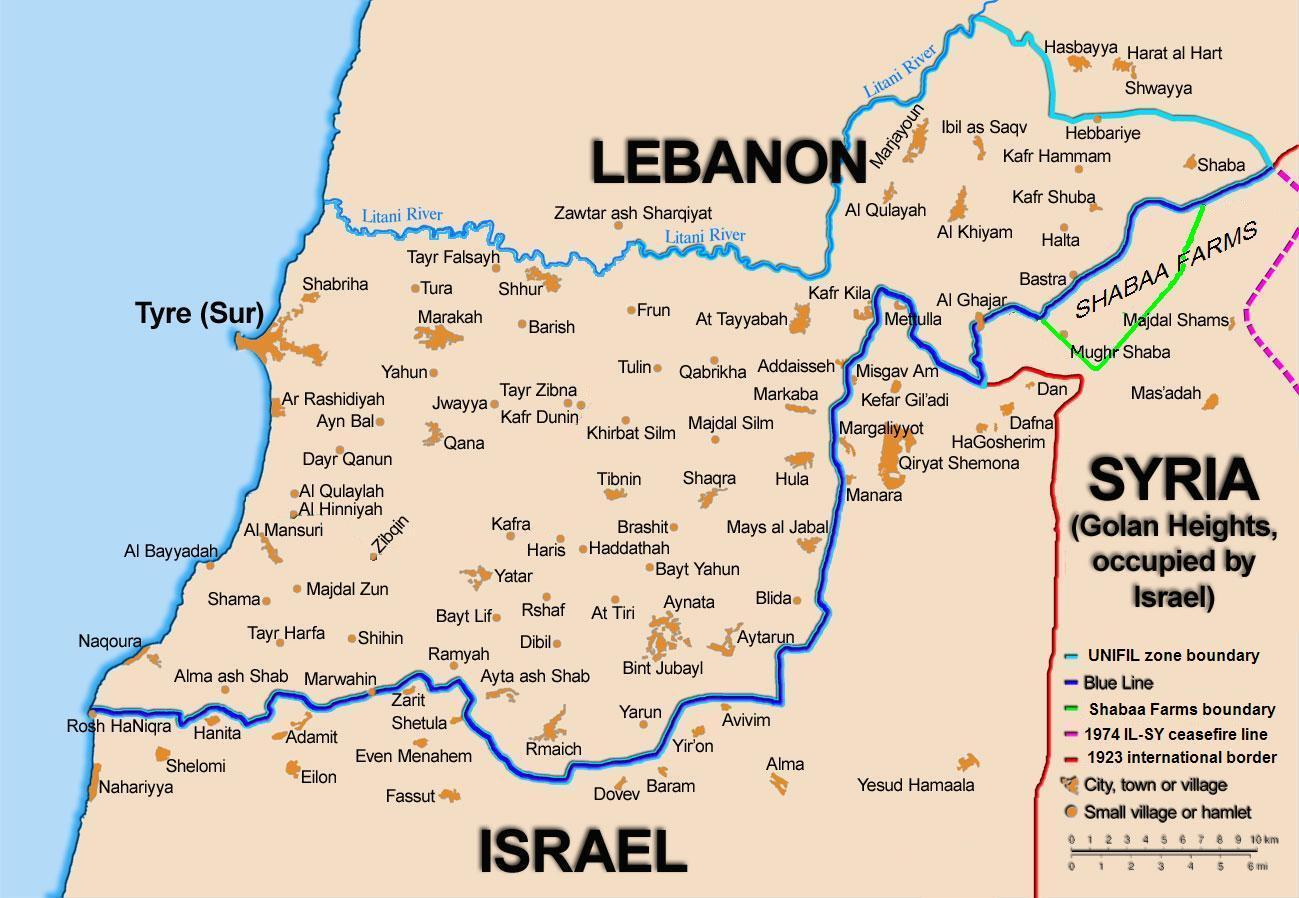
Map 5: The Blue Line covers the Lebanese–Israeli border; an extension covers the Lebanese–Golan Heights boundary.

On March 14, 1978, Israel launched Operation Litani, occupying the area south of the Litani River, excepting Tyre (see Map 5). In response to the invasion, the UN Security Council passed Council Resolution 425 and Resolution 426 calling for the withdrawal of Israeli forces from Lebanon. Israeli forces withdrew later in 1978, but turned over their positions inside Lebanon to their ally, the South Lebanon Army (SLA).

The United Nations in June 2000 was called upon to decide the Lebanese border to determine whether Israel had fully withdrawn from Lebanon in compliance with UN Security Council Resolution 425. This line came to be called the Blue Line. At the same time, the United Nations did not have to consider the legality of the boundary between Lebanon and the Israeli-controlled Golan Heights, as that was not required for the purpose of Council Resolution 425. Accordingly, the Armistice Demarcation Line between Lebanon and the Israeli-controlled Golan Heights is expressly not to be called the Blue Line.

On April 17, 2000, Israel announced that it would withdraw its forces from Lebanon. The Lebanese government refused to take part in marking the border. The UN thus conducted its own survey based on the line for the purpose of Council Resolution 425, which called for "strict respect for the territorial integrity, sovereignty and political independence of Lebanon within its internationally recognized boundaries".

From May 24 to June 7, 2000, the UN Special Envoy heard views in Israel, Lebanon and Syria. The United Nations cartographer and his team, assisted by UNIFIL, worked on the ground to identify a line to be adopted for the practical purposes of confirming the Israeli withdrawal. While it was agreed that this would not be a formal border demarcation, the aim was to identify a line on the ground closely conforming to the internationally recognized boundaries of Lebanon, based on the best available cartographic and other documentary evidence. On May 25, 2000, Israel notified the Secretary-General that it had redeployed its forces in compliance with Council Resolution 425, that is to the Internationally recognized Lebanese border. On June 7, the completed map showing the withdrawal line was formally transmitted by the force commander of UNIFIL to his Lebanese and Israeli counterparts. Notwithstanding their reservations about the line, the governments of Israel and Lebanon confirmed that identifying this line was solely the responsibility of the United Nations and that they would respect the line as identified.

On June 8, 2000, UNIFIL teams commenced the work of verifying the Israeli withdrawal behind the line.

=== The Blue Line ===
The Blue Line identified by the United Nations in 2000 as the border of Lebanon, from the Mediterranean Sea to the Hasbani River, closely approximates the Green Line set under the 1949 armistice agreement between Lebanon and Israel. The area east of the Hasbani River is considered part of Syria and included in the Golan Heights.

The armistice agreement between Lebanon and Israel was signed on March 23, 1949. The main points were:

- The terms of the agreement were dictated exclusively by military considerations.
- The armistice line (i.e., "Green Line") was the international border, which corresponds to the 1923 Mandate border between the Lebanon and Palestine (see: Treaty of Sèvres).
- Unlike the other Green Line agreements, it contains no clause disclaiming this line as an international border, and was thereafter treated as it had been previously, as the de jure international border of Lebanon.
- Israel withdrew its forces from 13 villages in Lebanese territory, which were occupied during the war.

In 1923, 38 boundary markers were placed along the 78-kilometre (48-mile) boundary and a detailed text description was published. The 2000 Blue Line differs in about a half dozen short stretches from the 1949 line, although never by more than 475 metres (1,558 ft).

Between 1950 and 1967, Israeli and Lebanese surveyors managed to complete 25 non-contiguous kilometers and mark (but not sign) another quarter of the international border.

The Secretary-General reported to the Security Council that Israel had withdrawn its forces from Lebanon on June 16, in accordance with Council Resolution 425, and met the requirements defined in his report of May 22, 2000. Since then, the term "Blue Line" has been the standard term for the withdrawal line in official UN communications.

=== Conflict over the Shebaa Farms ===
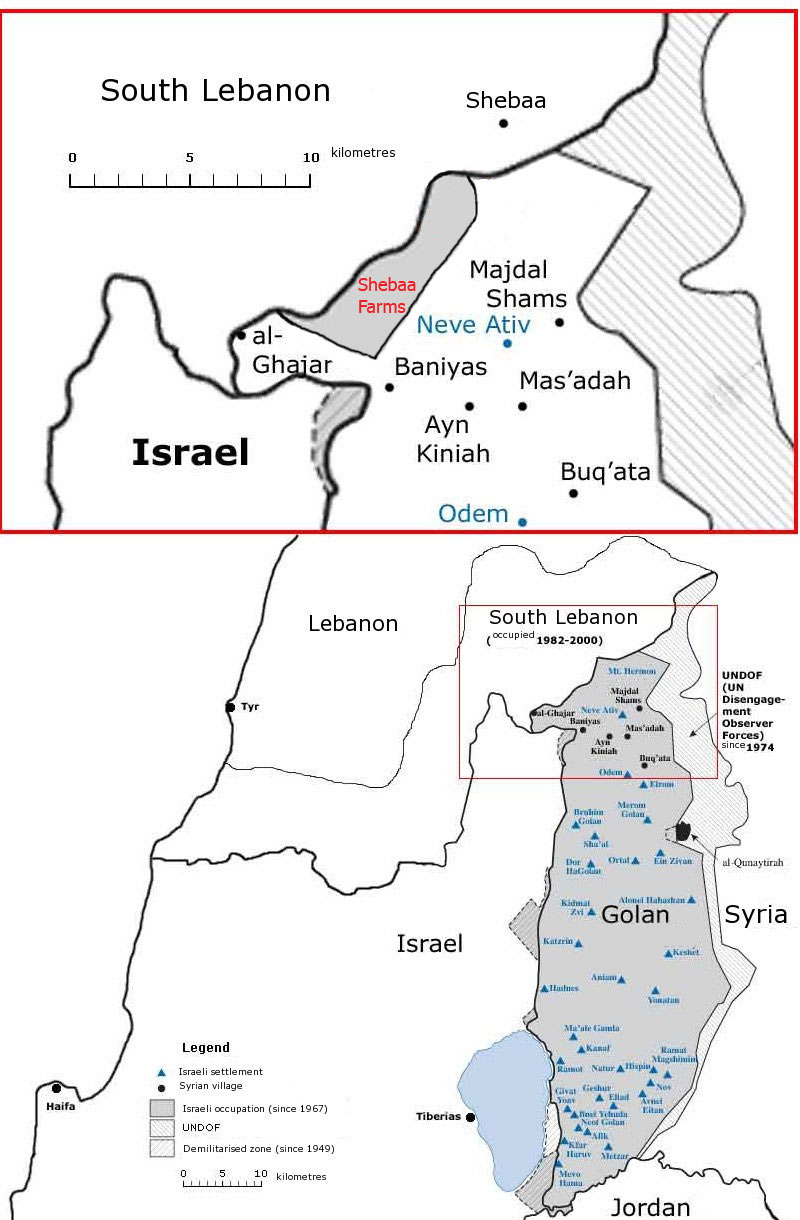
Map 6: Shebaa Farms

The Shebaa Farms conflict stems from Israel's occupation and annexation of the Golan Heights, with respect to that territory's border with Lebanon. Both Lebanon and Syria were within the French Mandate territory between 1920 and the end of the French Mandate in 1946. The dispute over the sovereignty over the Shebaa Farms resulted in part from the failure of French Mandate administrations, and subsequently from the failure of the Lebanon and Syria to properly demarcate the border between them.

Documents from the 1920s and 1930s indicate that some local inhabitants regarded themselves as part of Lebanon, for example paying taxes to the Lebanese government. But French officials at times expressed confusion as to the actual location of the border. One French official in 1939 expressed the belief that the uncertainty was sure to cause trouble in the future.

The region continued to be represented in the 1930s and 1940s as Syrian territory, under the French Mandate. Detailed maps showing the border were produced by the French in 1933, and again in 1945. They clearly showed the region to be in Syria.

After the French Mandate ended in 1946, the land was administered by Syria, and represented as such in all maps of the time. The maps of the 1949 armistice agreement between Syria and Israel also designated the area as Syrian.

Border disputes arose at times, however. Shebaa Farms was not unique; several other border villages had similar discrepancies of borders versus land ownership. Syria and Lebanon formed a joint Syrian–Lebanese border committee in the late 1950s to determine a proper border between the two nations. In 1964, concluding its work, the committee suggested to the two governments that the area be deemed the property of Lebanon, and recommended that the international border be reestablished consistent with its suggestion. However, neither Syria nor Lebanon adopted the committee's suggestion, and neither country took any action along the suggested lines. Thus, maps of the area continued to reflect the Farms as being in Syria. Even maps of both the Syrian and Lebanese armies continued to demarcate the region within Syrian territory (see map).

A number of local residents regarded themselves as Lebanese, however. The Lebanese government showed little interest in their views. The Syrian government administered the region, and on the eve of the 1967 war, the region was under effective Syrian control.

In 1967, most Shebaa Farms landowners and (Lebanese) farmers lived outside the Syrian-controlled region, across the Lebanon-Syrian border, in the Lebanese village of Shebaa. During the Six Day War in 1967, Israel captured the Golan Heights from Syria, including the Shebaa Farms area. As a consequence, the Lebanese landowners were no longer able to farm it.

=== Israel—Lebanon maritime border ===
As of April 2021, there was an ongoing dispute over the Mediterranean Sea border between Israel and Lebanon. Negotiations on the maritime border commenced in October 2020 and led to success, i.e. both sides reaching and ratifying an agreement in 2022.

=== 2024 Israeli invasions of Lebanon and Syria ===
Israeli invasions of Lebanon and Syria in 2024 have resulted in additional Lebanese and Syrian territory being occupied by Israeli forces. The Israeli military and Israeli settler movement has begun organizing trips for Israeli civilians inside the newly occupied part of Syria.

== Border with Egypt ==
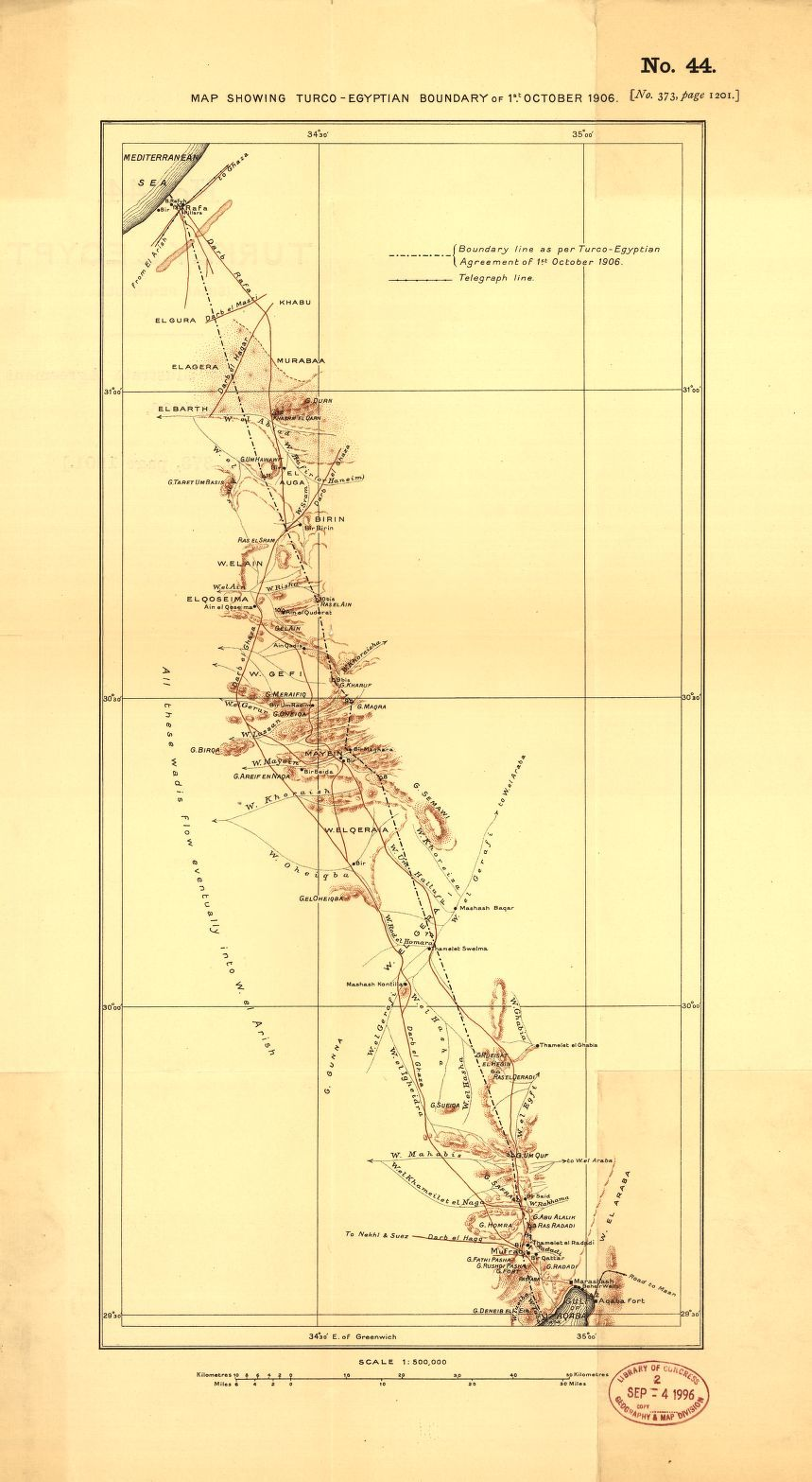
Map 7: Map showing Turco-Egyptian Boundary of October 1, 1906

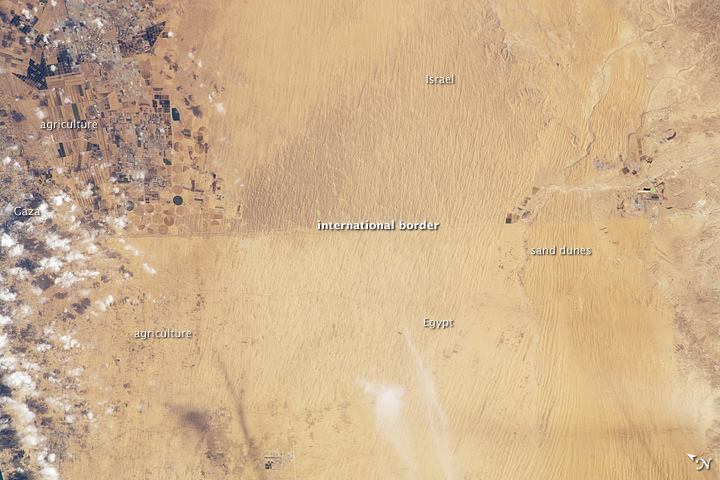
A clearly visible line marks about 80 kilometers (~50 mi) of the international border between Egypt and Israel in this photograph from the International Space Station. The reason for the color difference is likely a higher level of grazing by the Bedouin-tended animal herds on the Egyptian side of the border.

A border between the Ottoman Empire and British controlled Khedivate of Egypt was drawn in the Ottoman–British agreement of October 1, 1906, after a prolonged border dispute and a military crisis earlier that year.

According to the personal documents of the British colonel Wilfed A. Jennings Bramley, who influenced the negotiations, the border mainly served British military interests—it furthered the Ottomans as much as possible from the Suez Canal, and gave Britain complete control over both Red Sea gulfs—Suez and Aqaba, including the Straits of Tiran. At the time, the Aqaba branch of the Hejaz railway had not been built, and the Ottomans therefore had no simple access to the Red Sea. The British were also interested in making the border as short and patrollable as possible, and some contest that it did not take into account the needs of the local residents in the negotiations, although its clauses did allow free access to the water sources west of the line to civilians, military and gendarmes from the Ottoman side, as well as full transhumance rights according to tribal rules for the Naqb (Negev) and Sinai Bedouin. It was defined as an "administrative separating line" for diplomatic reasons, allowing the Ottoman Empire to hold to its nominal sovereignty over Egypt.

The 1949 armistice agreement between Israel and Egypt was ratified on February 24, 1949. The armistice line between these countries followed the international border except along the Gaza Strip, which remained under Egyptian occupation.

The Egypt–Israel peace treaty, signed on March 26, 1979, created an officially recognized international border along the 1906 line, with Egypt renouncing all claims to the Gaza Strip. A dispute arose over the marking of the border line at its southernmost point, in Taba. Taba was on the Egyptian side of the armistice line of 1949, but Israel claimed that Taba had been on the Ottoman side of a border agreed between the Ottomans and British Egypt in 1906, and that there had previously been an error in marking the line. The issue was submitted to an international commission composed of one Israeli, one Egyptian, and three outsiders. In 1988, the commission ruled in Egypt's favor, and Israel withdrew from Taba later that year.

== Borders with Palestine ==
=== End of British Mandate ===
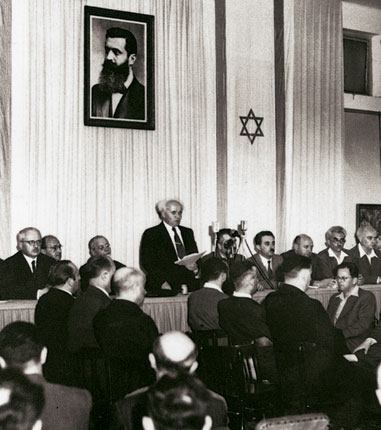
David Ben-Gurion proclaiming independence beneath a large portrait of Theodor Herzl, founder of modern Zionism

On November 29, 1947, the UN General Assembly adopted Resolution 181 (II) recommending the adoption and implementation of a plan to partition Palestine into "Independent Arab and Jewish States" and a "Special International Regime for the City of Jerusalem" administered by the United Nations. The Jewish Agency for Palestine, on behalf of the Jewish community, despite its misgivings, indicated acceptance of the plan. With a few exceptions, the Arab leaders and governments rejected the plan of partition in the resolution and indicated that they would reject any other plan of partition. Britain declared that the Mandate was to end on May 15, 1948.

On May 14, 1948, David Ben-Gurion, in a ceremony in Tel Aviv, declared "the establishment of a Jewish state in Eretz-Israel, to be known as the State of Israel." Epstein, Agent, Provisional Government of Israel said in a letter to President Truman seeking recognition from the U.S. government, sent immediately after the Declaration of May 14, 1948, "that the state of Israel has been proclaimed as an independent republic within frontiers approved by the General Assembly of the United Nations in its Resolution of November 29, 1947", (i.e., within the area designated as the "Jewish state" in the partition plan).

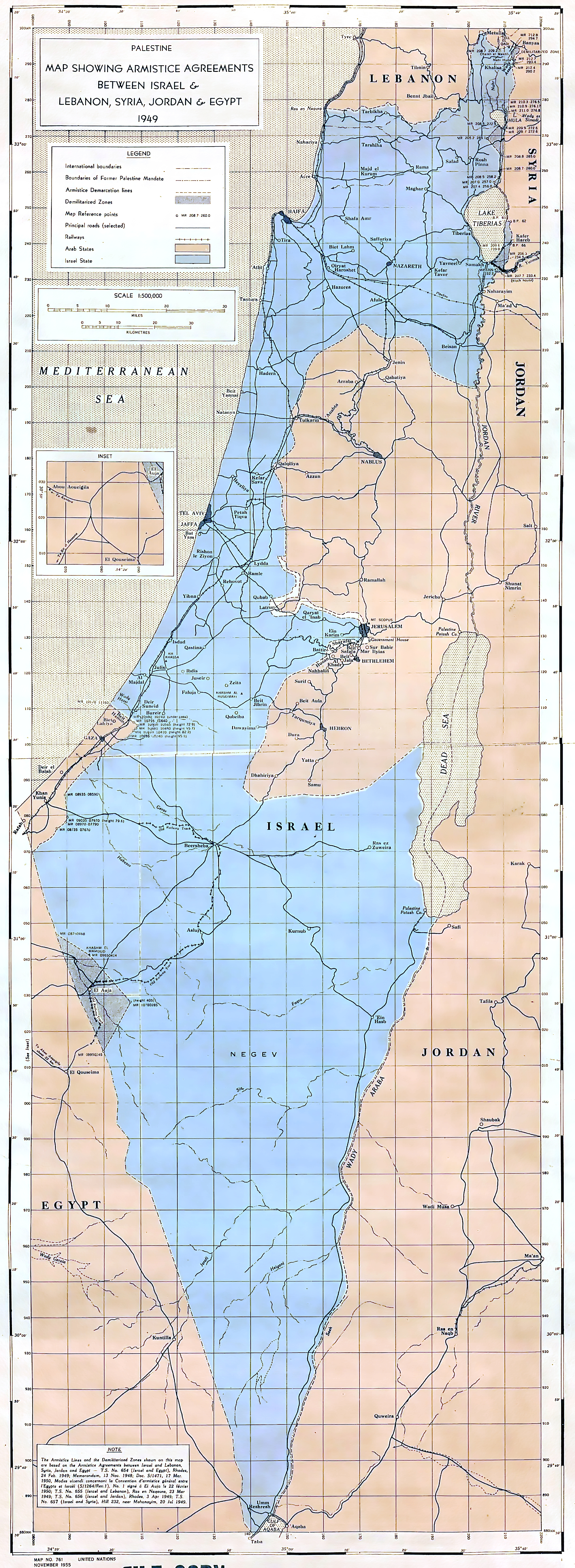
Map 8: Israel's 1949 Green Line territory according to a 1955 United Nations map

On May 15, regular Arab armies entered what had been Mandate Palestine. This intervention/invasion marked the transition of the 1947–1948 Civil War in Mandatory Palestine into the 1948 Arab–Israeli War. The tide of battle soon turned against the Arabs, and Israel then launched a series of military offensives, greatly expanding its territorial holdings. The end of the war saw the Lausanne Conference of 1949. Following internationally supervised Arab-Israeli negotiations, a boundary based on the cease-fire lines of the war with minor territorial adjustments, commonly referred to as the Green Line, was agreed upon in the 1949 Armistice Agreements. The Green Line was expressly declared in the Armistice Agreements as a temporary demarcation line, rather than a permanent border, and the Armistice Agreements relegated the issue of permanent borders to future negotiations. The area to the west of the Jordan River came to be called the West Bank, and was annexed by Jordan in 1950; and the Gaza Strip was occupied by Egypt. During the Six-Day War of 1967, Israel captured the West Bank from Jordan, Gaza Strip and Sinai peninsula from Egypt, and Golan Heights from Syria, and placed these territories under military occupation.

On September 22, 1948, during a truce in the war, the Provisional State Council of Israel passed a law to extend its laws to any part of Palestine that Israel had captured or will capture in the war.

=== Subsequent events ===
In 1988, Palestine declared its independence without specifying its borders. Jordan extended recognition to Palestine and renounced its claim to the West Bank to the Palestinian Liberation Organisation, which had been previously designated by the Arab League as the "sole legitimate representative of the Palestinian people". Together with this renunciation, Jordan revoked citizenship from all Palestinians residing in the West Bank.

In 2011, Palestine submitted an application for membership to the United Nations, using the borders for military administration that existed before 1967, effectively the 1949 armistice line or Green Line. As Israel does not recognize the State of Palestine, Jordan's borders with Israel remain unclear, at least in the sector of the West Bank.

By the Egypt–Israel peace treaty of 1979, Egypt renounced all claims to the Gaza Strip. In 1988, Jordan renounced all claims to the West Bank; this was made official in the Israel–Jordan Treaty of Peace of 1994. The Green Line is Israel's contested boundary with the Palestinian territories.

The boundaries of a future Palestinian State, vis-a-vis Israel, are subject to ongoing negotiations in the Israel–Palestinian peace process. Israel's West Bank Wall, which encompasses almost all Israeli settlements, including all three major cities, and only a minor Palestinian population, was declared by Prime Minister Ehud Olmert as running roughly along the future borders of Israel. Israeli Foreign Minister Avigdor Lieberman proposed that the Arab-Israeli border region known as the Triangle be removed from Israeli sovereignty and transferred to the Palestinian Authority, in exchange for the border settlement blocs. The Palestinian Authority claims all of these territories (including East Jerusalem) for a future Palestinian State, and its position is supported by the Arab League in the 2002 Arab Peace Initiative which calls for the return by Israel to "the 1967 borders". While Israel has expressed desire to annex the border settlement blocs and keep East Jerusalem, its border with Gaza has largely been solidified, especially following Israel's withdrawal in 2005. Israel has not made claims to any portion of Gazan territory and offered the entire area to Palestinians as part of the 2000 Camp David Summit.

At the same time, Israel has continued to claim a nominal strip on the border between the West Bank and Jordan, and between Gaza and Egypt as its border with those countries. This is viewed as a legalistic device to enable Israel to control the entry of people and materials into the Palestinian territories.

=== Status of Jerusalem ===
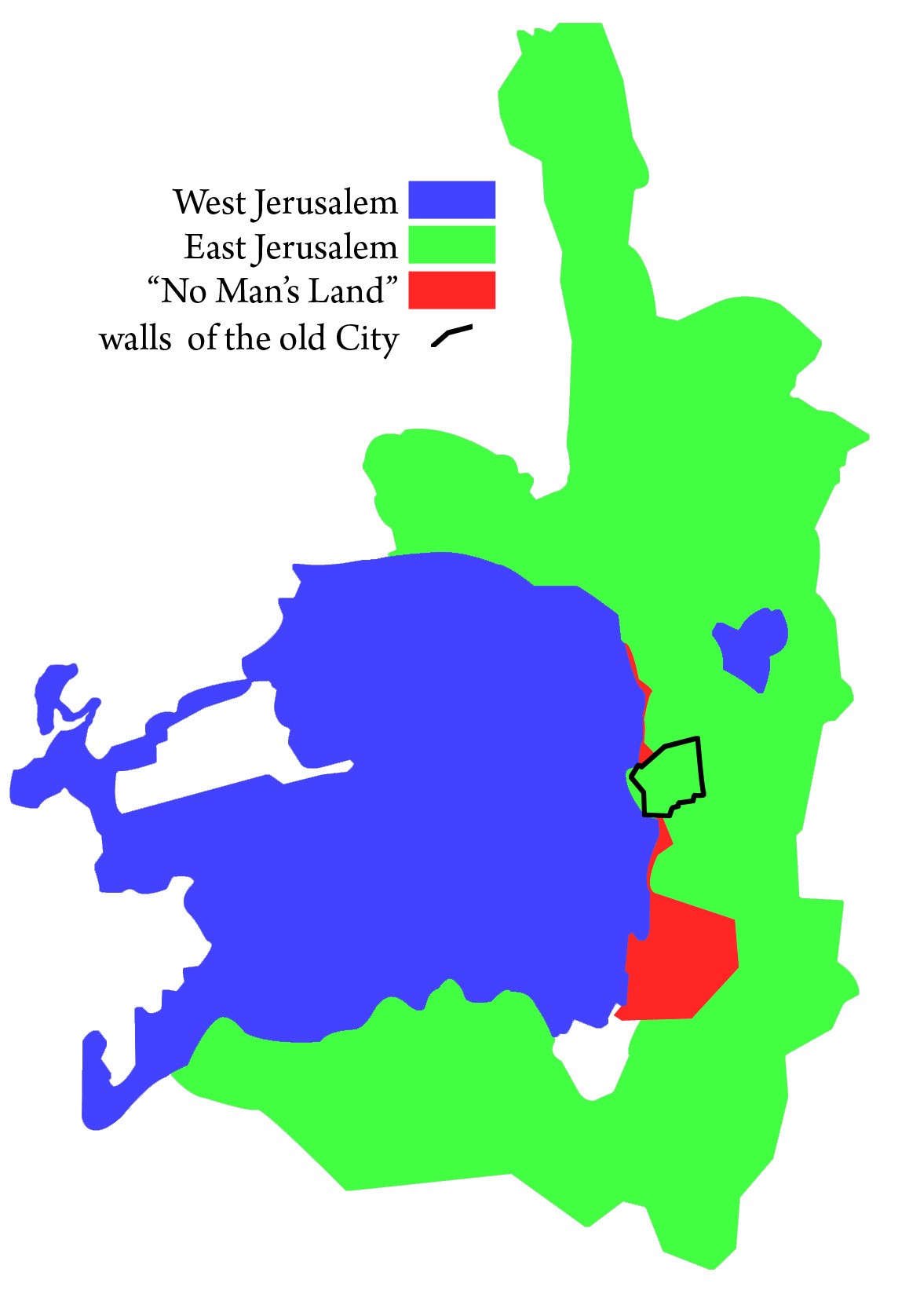
Map 9: Jerusalem municipal area

The status and boundary of Jerusalem continue to be in dispute.

Following the 1948 Arab–Israeli War, Israel was in control of West Jerusalem while Jordan was in control of East Jerusalem (including the walled Old City in which most of the holy places are located). During the Six-Day War of 1967, Israel gained control of the West Bank, as well as East Jerusalem, and shortly after extended Jerusalem's municipality city limits to cover the whole of East Jerusalem and the surrounding area, and applied its laws, jurisdiction, and administration to that territory. In 1980, the Knesset passed the Jerusalem Law, declaring Jerusalem to be the "complete and united" capital of Israel. The Israeli government offered citizenship to the Palestinian residents of that territory, most of whom refused, and are treated today as permanent residents under Israeli law. According to the Israeli rights organisation, HaMoked, if these Palestinians live abroad for seven years, or gain citizenship or residency elsewhere, they lose their Israeli residency status.

The purported annexation of East Jerusalem was criticised by Palestinian, Arab and other leaders, and was declared by the United Nations Security Council "a violation of international law" and "null and void" in Resolution 478, and has not been recognized by the international community, and all countries moved their embassies from Jerusalem.

On December 6, 2017, US President Donald Trump announced the United States recognition of Jerusalem as the capital of Israel. Secretary of State Rex Tillerson clarified "that the final status [for Jerusalem], including the borders, would be left to the two parties to negotiate and decide." Since then, several other countries have formally recognised Jerusalem as the capital of Israel, and moved their embassies there.

== See also ==
- 2011 Israeli border demonstrations
- Baraita of the Boundaries
- Border
- From Dan to Beersheba
- National boundary delimitation

== Bibliography ==
- Abu-Lughod, Ibrahim (1988). "Territorially-based Nationalism and the Politics of Negation". In Edward Said and Christopher Hitchens (ed.). Blaming the Victims: Spurious Scholarship and the Palestinian Question. Verso. ISBN 978-1-85984-340-6.
- Alsberg, Paul Avraham [in German] (1973). קביעת הגבול המזרחי של ארץ ישראל [Determining the Eastern Boundary of the Land of Israel]. In Daniel Carpi (ed.). הציונות: מאסף לתולדות התנועה הציונית והישוב היהודי בארץ־ישראל. וניברסיטת תל-אביב, הוצאת הכבוץ המיוחד. available in pdf here
  - Alsberg, Avraham P. [in German] (1980). "Delimitation of the eastern border of Palestine". Studies in Zionism. Vol. 2. Institute for Zionist Research Founded in Memory of Chaim Weizmann. pp. 87–98. doi:10.1080/13531048108575800.
- Agreement between His Majesty's Government and the French Government respecting the Boundary Line between Syria and Palestine from the Mediterranean to El Hámmé, Treaty Series No. 13 (1923), Cmd. 1910.
- Biger, Gideon (2004). The Boundaries of Modern Palestine, 1840–1947. Routledge. ISBN 978-1-135-76652-8.
- Biger, Gideon (1989), Geographical and other arguments in delimitation in the boundaries of British Palestine, in "International Boundaries and Boundary Conflict Resolution", IBRU Conference, ISBN 1-85560-000-5, pp. 41–61.
- Biger, Gideon (1995), The encyclopedia of international boundaries, New York: Facts on File.
- Biger, Gideon (2005), The Boundaries of Modern Palestine, 1840-1947. London: Routledge. ISBN 0-7146-5654-2.
- Franco-British Convention on Certain Points Connected with the Mandates for Syria and the Lebanon, Palestine and Mesopotamia, signed December 23, 1920. Text available in American Journal of International Law, Vol. 16, No. 3, 1922, 122–126.
- Gardus, Yehuda; Shmueli, Avshalom, eds. (1978–1979). The Land of the Negev (English title) (in Hebrew). Ministry of Defense Publishing.
- Garfinkle, Adam (1998). "History and Peace: Revisiting two Zionist myths". Israel Affairs. 5 (1): 126–148. doi:10.1080/13537129808719501.
- Gil-Har, Yitzhak (1993), British commitments to the Arabs and their application to the Palestine-Trans-Jordan boundary: The issue of the Semakh triangle, Middle Eastern Studies, Vol.29, No.4, pp. 690–701.
- Klieman, Aaron S. (1970). Foundations of British policy in the Arab world: the Cairo Conference of 1921. Johns Hopkins Press. ISBN 9780801811258.
- McTague, John (1982), Anglo-French Negotiations over the Boundaries of Palestine, 1919–1920, Journal of Palestine Studies, Vol. 11, No. 2, pp. 101–112.
- Muhsin, Yusuf (1991), The Zionists and the process of defining the borders of Palestine, 1915–1923, Journal of South Asian and Middle Eastern Studies, Vol. 15, No. 1, pp. 18–39.
- US Department of State, International Boundary Study series: Iraq-Jordan, Iraq-Syria, Jordan-Syria, Israel-Lebanon.
- Wasserstein, Bernard (2008). Israel and Palestine: Why They Fight and Can They Stop?. Profile Books. ISBN 978-1-84668-092-2.
