= Korean Genome Project =

South Korean genetics project

Korean Genome Project (Korea1K) is the largest genome sequencing project in Korea, first launched in 2015 as part of the Genome Korea in Ulsan. As of 2021, the project has sequenced over 10,000 human genomes and is the first large-scale data base for constructing a genetic map and diversity analysis of Koreans.

== History ==
KGP was originated from the national initiative of sequencing the reference Korean and whole population genomes in 2006 by KOBIC, KRIBB and NCSRD, KRISS, Daejeon in Korea. From 2009, KGP was supported by the Genome Research Foundation and TheragenEtex to build the Variome of Koreans as well as the Korean Reference Genome (KOREF). Starting from KOREF, a consensus variome reference, providing information on millions of variants from 40 additional ethnically homogeneous genomes from the Korean Personal Genome Project was completed in 2017. Updating the technology an improved version of KOREF was then constructed using long-read sequencing data produced by Oxford Nanopore PromethION and PacBio technologies has been released showcasing newer assembly technologies and techniques. In 2022 a new chromosome-level haploid assembly of KOREF was published, assembled using Oxford Nanopore Technologies PromethION, Pacific Biosciences HiFi-CCS, and Hi-C technology.

Since 2014, KGP has been supported by Ulsan National Institute of Science and Technology, Clinomics, and Ulsan City, Ulsan, Korea.

== Science & development ==
Korea1K) has been used in sequencing technologies such as MGI DNBSEQ-T7 and Illumina HiSeq2000, HiSeq2500, HiSeq4000, HiSeqX10, and NovaSeq6000 sequencing technologies. The variome data has been a reference to study the origin and composition of Korean ethnicity when compared to ancient DNA sequences.

Korea1K released 1,094 Korean whole genome sequences on 27 May 2020, published in Science Advances.

In April 2024, Korea4K was published, making whole genome sequences of 4,157 Koreans publicly accessible alongside an imputation reference panel and 107 phenotypes derived from extensive health check-ups.
