= Cairo Conference (disambiguation) =

The Cairo Conference was a November 1943 conference between Chiang Kai-shek, Winston Churchill, and Franklin Roosevelt.

Cairo Conference may also refer to:

- Cairo Conference (1921), a British conference that established the British policy for the Middle East
- Second Cairo Conference, a December 1943 conference between İsmet İnönü, Roosevelt, and Churchill
- 2nd Summit of the Non-Aligned Movement of 1964
- International Conference on Population and Development, a 1994 conference of the United Nations Population Fund

== See also ==
- List of conferences in Cairo
