= Transjordan memorandum =

British memorandum passed by the League of Nations in September 1922

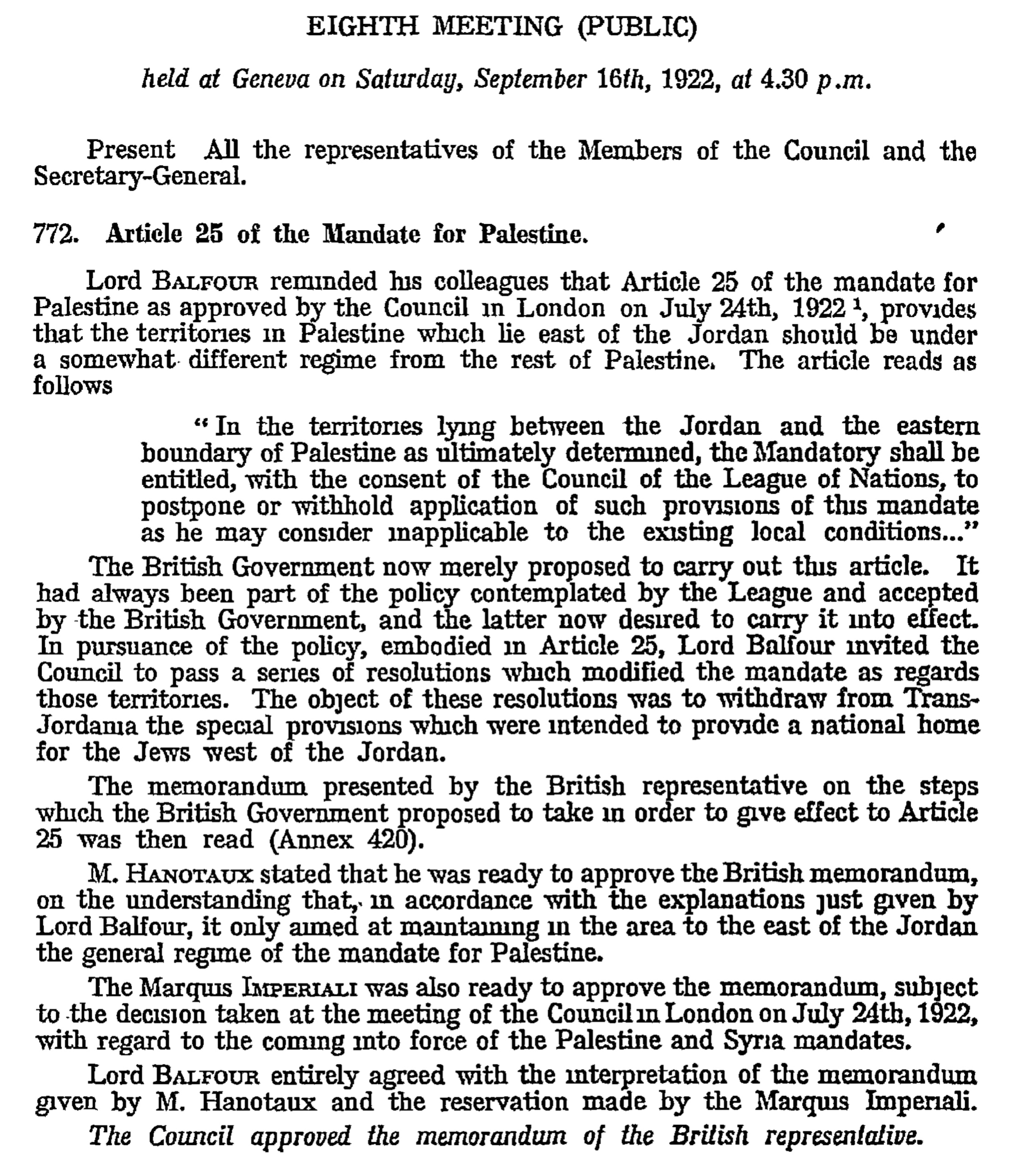
Transjordan memorandum approval at the Council of the League of Nations, 16 September 1922

The Transjordan memorandum was a British memorandum passed by the Council of the League of Nations on 16 September 1922, as an addendum to the Mandate for Palestine.

The memorandum described how the British government planned to implement Article 25 of the Mandate, which had been drafted during the March 1921 Cairo Conference to include Transjordan in the Mandate without applying the provisions regarding Jewish settlement.

== Background ==
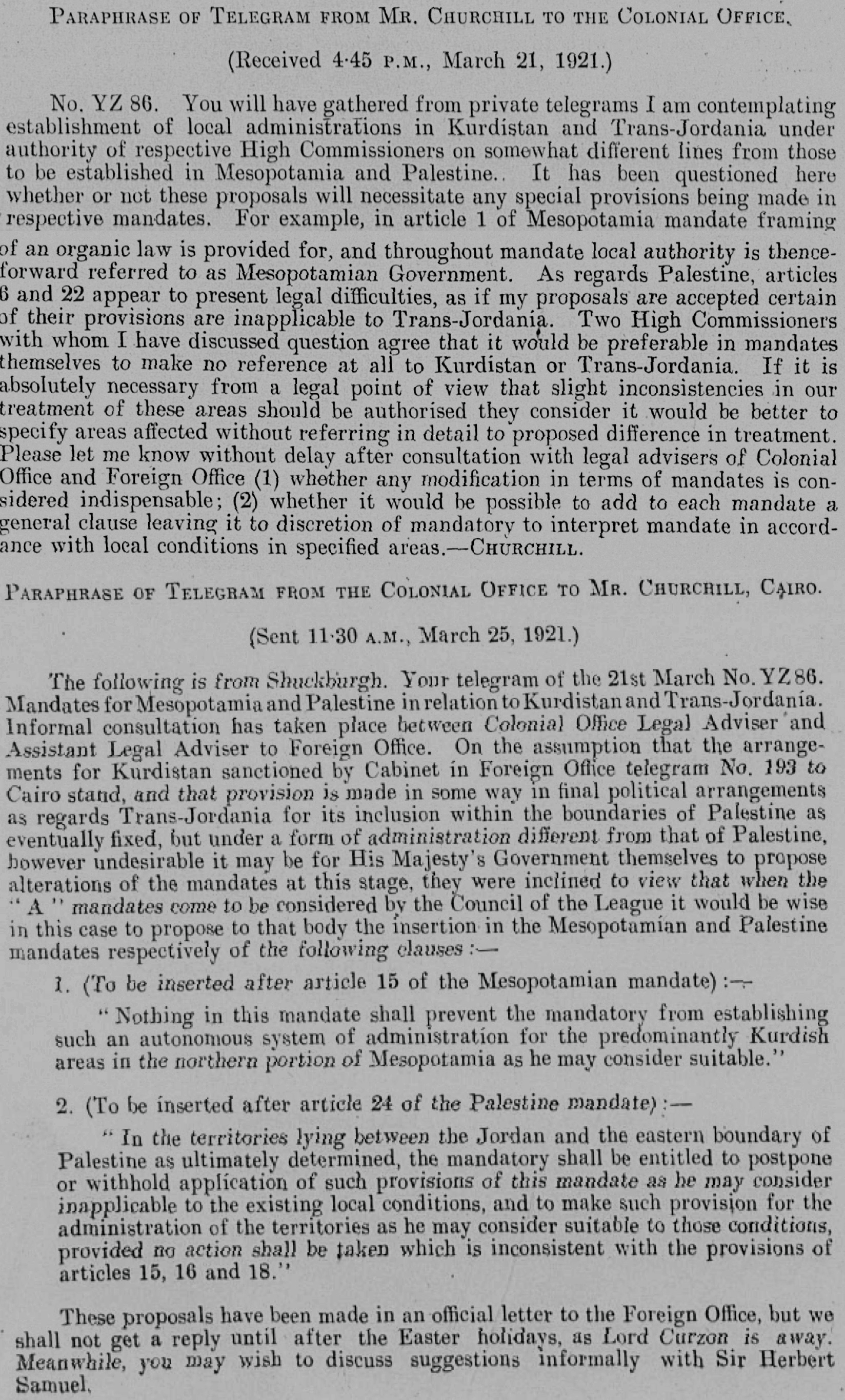
British Government proposal to include Transjordan within the Palestine Mandate via what became "Article 25"

In the aftermath of WWI, the Levant was divided by the British and French into three military regions known as OETA North, South and East. OETA South roughly comprised what became Mandatory Palestine, with eastern boundary at the Jordan River, while OETA East included a major portion of Transjordan. Local councils were established in Transjordan under British guidance in early 1920, but Transjordan had no unified administration until the arrival in November 1920 of Abdullah bin al-Hussein, who was appointed Emir of Transjordan in 1921.

Meanwhile, the San Remo conference had awarded Great Britain the mandate for Palestine without defining its boundaries. This presented the British with the problem of how to maintain a controlling influence over Transjordan without including it in the "Jewish homeland", while at the same time being seen to keep promises made to the Arabs. The solution adopted was to include Transjordan within the scope of the mandate for Palestine while preserving its autonomous political entity. This led to Article 25 of the Mandate document and the 1922 memorandum which detailed its implementation.

=== Article 25 ===
Article 25 of the Mandate for Palestine allowed for the exclusion of Transjordan from unspecified provisions of the Mandate. On 16 September 1922, Lord Balfour, representing the United Kingdom, reminded the Council of the League of Nations of Article 25 (which had been previously approved but had not yet come into effect). He then told the council that the British government now proposed to carry out this article, as had always been intended by the League of Nations and the British government. He then presented a memorandum for approval.

== Borders ==
The Palestine Order in Council of August 1922 gave the High Commissioner authority to define the boundary between the territories of Transjordan and Palestine. The resulting definition was copied verbatim into the September memorandum:

all territory lying to the east of a line drawn from a point two miles west of the town of Akaba on the Gulf of that name up the centre of the Wady Araba, Dead Sea and River Jordan to its junction with the River Yarmuk: thence up the centre of that river to the Syrian frontier.

== Exclusions and application of the Mandate ==
The memorandum listed as exclusions articles 4, 6, 13, 14, 22, 23, and parts of the Preamble and Articles 2, 7 and 11, including the articles of the Mandate concerning a Jewish national home. It concluded with:

In the application of the Mandate to Transjordan, the action which, in Palestine, is taken by the Administration of the latter country will be taken by the Administration of Transjordan under the general supervision of the Mandatory. His Majesty's Government accept full responsibility as Mandatory for Transjordan, and undertake that such provision as may be made for the administration of that territory in accordance with Article 25 of the Mandate shall be in no way inconsistent with those provisions of the Mandate which are not by this resolution declared inapplicable.

From that point onwards, Britain administered the part west of the Jordan as Palestine, and the part east of the Jordan as Transjordan. Technically they remained one mandate covering 2 territories but most official documents nonetheless referred to them as if they were two separate mandates. In May 1923 Transjordan was granted internal self-government with Abdullah as ruler and Harry St. John Philby as chief representative.
