= List of systems biology conferences =

Systems biology is a biological study field that focuses on the systematic study of complex interactions in biological systems, thus using a new perspective (integration instead of reduction) to study them. Particularly from year 2000 onwards, the term is used widely in the biosciences.

The field has generated interest among scientists, resulting in regular and one-time conferences and meetings. Below is a partial list.

Logo of the International q-bio Conference, a leading Systems biology modeling conference in Santa Fe, New Mexico.

Date	Meeting	City	Country	URL
2–4 March 2020	Asian Regional Conference on Systems Biology 2020 (ARCSB2020)	Langkawi	Malaysia	https://arcsb2020.weebly.com/
9 December 2019	Asian Young Researchers Conference on Computational and Omics Biology	Sydney	Australia	https://www.combine.org.au/symp/symp19/
22–26 July 2019	6th International Synthetic & Systems Biology Summer School – SSBSS 2019	Pisa	Italy	https://ssbss2019.icas.xyz
7–13 Apr 2019	Whole-cell modeling summer school	Barcelona	Spain	http://meetings.embo.org/event/19-whole-cell-modelling
15–19 Oct 2018	INCOME 2018: Integrative pathway modeling in systems biology and systems medicine	Bernried, Lake Starnberg	Germany	http://www.integrative-pathway-models.de/meeting-2018
14–16 Oct 2018	COBRA 2018: 5th Conference on Constraint-Based Reconstruction and Analysis	Seattle	USA	https://www.aiche.org/sbe/conferences/conference-on-constraint-based-reconstruction-and-analysis-cobra/2018
08–09 Oct 2018	Systems Biology 2018	Amsterdam	Netherlands	https://systembiology.euroscicon.com/
5 October 2018	byteMAL Conference: Bioinformatics for Young inTernational researchers Expo: Maastricht-Aachen-Liège	Liège	Belgium	http://www.bytemal.org/
7 July 2018	SysMod: Computational Modeling of Biological Systems	Chicago	USA	http://sysmod.info/2018
23 June 2017	byteMAL Conference	Maastricht	Netherlands	https://projects.bigcat.unimaas.nl/bytemal/2017-2/
4–7 September 2017	2017 Whole-Cell Modeling Summer School	Barcelona	Spain	http://www.wholecell.org/school-2017/
29 August – 2 September 2016	2nd International Conference "Mathematical Modeling and High-Performance Computing in Bioinformatics, Biomedicine and Biotechnology"	Novosibirsk	Russia	http://conf.bionet.nsc.ru/mm-hpc-bbb-2016/en/
2–4 August 2016	2nd International Summer Symposium on Systems Biology (IS3B)	Mexico City	Mexico	http://is3b.inmegen.gob.mx/
8–14 July 2016	2016 SSBSS 3rd Int. Synthetic & Systems Biology Summer School	Volterra	Italy	http://www.taosciences.it/ssbss/
9 July 2016	First SysMod ISMB SIG	Orlando	United States	http://sysmod.info/SysMod_SIG_2016
6–8 April 2016	2016 Systems Biology of Mammalien Cells (SBMC)	Munich	Germany	http://www.sbmc2016.de/
3–8 April 2016	2016 Whole-Cell Modeling Summer School	Barcelona	Spain	http://www.wholecell.org/school-2016/
9–10 December 2015	2015 The first Pearl Seiden International meeting in Life Sciences: From synthetic biology to discovery and applications	Haifa	Israel	http://pearlseiden.net.technion.ac.il/
22–25 June 2015	7th Young Scientists School "Bioinformatics and systems biology" SBB-2015	Novosibirsk	Russia	http://conf.nsc.ru/SBB2015
Annually; Alternates between US and Germany. 17–19 June 2014.	Systems Biology of Human Disease (SBHD)	Boston; Heidelberg	United States; Germany	http://www.sbhd2014.org/
23–28 June 2014	9th International Conference on Bioinformatics of Genome Regulation and Structure\System Biology BGRS\SB-2014	Novosibirsk	Russia	http://conf.nsc.ru/BGRSSB2014
23–28 June 2014	6th Young Scientists School "Bioinformatics and systems biology" SBB-2014	Novosibirsk	Russia	http://conf.nsc.ru/BGRSSB2014/en/bgrssb2014_young_scientists_school
06–10 April 2014	The third international conference "Genetics of aging and longevity"	Sochi	Russia	http://aging-genes2014.com
21–25 July 2013	International Conference on NextGeneration Sequencing	Novosibirsk	Russia	http://conf.nsc.ru/HSG/en/info_letter
23–27 June 2013	Systems Biology of Infection Symposium	Ascona	Switzerland	http://www.infectx.ch/SysBioInf/
Annually around November	International Conference on Computational Systems-Biology and Bioinformatics (CSBio)	varies	varies	http://www.csbio.org/
21–24 September 2010	Frontiers of Multidisciplinary Research: Mathematics, Engineering and Biology	Exeter	United Kingdom	http://www.exeter.ac.uk/frontiers%5B‍%5D
Yearly, second week of August	International q-bio Conference	Santa Fe	United States	http://q-bio.org
16–20 September 2016	International Conference on Systems Biology (ICSB)	varies	varies	https://web.archive.org/web/20160630065605/http://www.icsb2016barcelona.org/
1968	"Systems Theory and Biology" symposium	[Case]	United States
Every two years, since 1989	International Conference on Molecular Systems Biology (ICMSB)	varies	varies	https://web.archive.org/web/20150412202101/http://www.ibsi.gatech.edu/FSSB13 In 2015, it will take place in Japan, TBD.
Every two years. 15–18 August 2010.	International Workshop on Systems Biology (IWSB)	Maynooth	Ireland	http://www.hamilton.ie/SystemsBiology/Workshop2010/IWSB_Welcome.html
Annually, end of January	Southern California Systems Biology Conference (SCSB)	Irvine	United States	https://web.archive.org/web/20110728033345/http://www.socalsysbio.org/
