= Patome =

Content
- Description: sequence annotation and analysis in patents.

Contact
- Laboratory: Korean BioInformation Center, KRIBB, Daejeon 305-806, Korea.
- Authors: Byungwook Lee
- Primary citation: Lee & al. (2007)
- Release date: 2006

Access
- Website: http://www.patome.org/
- Download URL: http://verdi.kobic.re.kr/patome_int/download.jsp

Patome is a database of biological sequence data of issued patents and/or published applications.

== See also ==
- Patents
- Gene patent
