= Asian Young Researchers Conference on Computational and Omics Biology =

The Asian Young Researchers Conference on Computational and Omics Biology (AYRCOB) is a conference series for young researchers and students who are conducting their research in the fields of computational, omics and systems biology in Asia. The main objectives of AYRCOB are to promote international exchange among young researchers in Asia and to deliver lectures given by leading researchers. One of unique characteristics of AYRCOB is that the conference itself is organized by young researchers (graduate students and post-doctoral fellows). From the outstanding performance of young students, the Dean Prize of the Graduate School of Frontier Sciences by the University of Tokyo has been awarded to the committee in 2009 and 2011 respectively.

In 2016 and 2017, AYRCOB was held jointly with the International Conference on Genome Informatics Workshop (GIW).

== Affiliated Organizations ==
The AYRCOB has several affiliated organizations including:

China

- Beijing Genomics Institute (BGI)

Japan

- The University of Tokyo
- Graduate University for Advanced Studies

Korea

- Yonsei University
- Ewha Womans University
- University of Science and Technology (UST)

Singapore

- Nanyang Technological University
- National University of Singapore

Taiwan

- National Yang-Ming University
- National Cheng Kung University
- Taiwan International Graduate Program, Academia Sinica
- Institute of Bioinformatics and Structural Biology of National Tsing Hua University
- National Chiao Tung University
- National Central University

== Sponsors ==
The AYRCOB has various sponsors including:

China

- Beijing Genomics Institute

Japan

- The University of Tokyo Global COE Program (Deciphering Biosphere from Genome Big Bang)
- Japanese Society for Bioinformatics

Korea

- Korean Bioinformation Center
- Korean University of Science and Technology (UST)
- Daejeon Convention and Visitors Bureau
- Yonsei University
- Hankyoreh Media Group
- The Korea Institute of Science and Technology Information (KISTI)

Singapore

- The Asia Pacific Bioinformatics Network (APBioNet)
- PUB, Singapore's National Water Agency

Taiwan

- Ministry of Education
- National Cheng Kung University (NCKU)
- National Science Council
- National Tsing Hua University
- National Chiao Tung University

Among the various sponsors that have supported AYRCOB, the 21st COE Program Elucidation of Language Structure and Semantics behind Genome and Life System (1st and 2nd conferences); its succeeding program, the Global COE Program Deciphering Biosphere from Genome Big Bang (after the 3rd conference); and the University of Tokyo, Japan have been the principal supporters thus far. The two COE programs aim to create a globally renowned research and education base at the Graduate School of Frontier Sciences. Because the GCOE program is a temporally limited program, it is as yet undecided whether a continuous support will be provided.

== List of conferences ==
- Japan-Taiwan Young Researchers Conference on Computational and Systems Biology, 2008 was held at National Tsing Hua University, Taiwan
- The 2nd Taiwan-Japan Young Researchers Conference on Computational and Systems Biology, 2008 was held at CBRC, AIST, Japan
- 3rd AYRCOB, 2010 was held at National Cheng Kung University, Taiwan
- 4th AYRCOB, 2010 was held at Matrix, Biopolis, Singapore
- 5th AYRCOB, 2011 was held at University of Science and Technology, Korea
- 6th AYRCOB, 2012 was held at BGI, Shenzhen, China
- 7th AYRCOB, 2013 was held at CBRC, Tokyo, Japan
- 8th AYRCOB, 2015 was held at National Chiao Tung University, Taiwan
- 9th AYRCOB, 2016 was held at Matrix, Biopolis, Singapore.
- 10th AYRCOB, 2016 was held at Fudan University, Shanghai, China.
- 11th AYRCOB, 2017 was held at Samjung Hotel, Seoul, South Korea.
- AYRCOB 2019 was held at the University of Sydney, Sydney, Australia.
