= Aaron Klieman =

Academician and Public Policy expert (1939–2021)

- אהרן קליימן
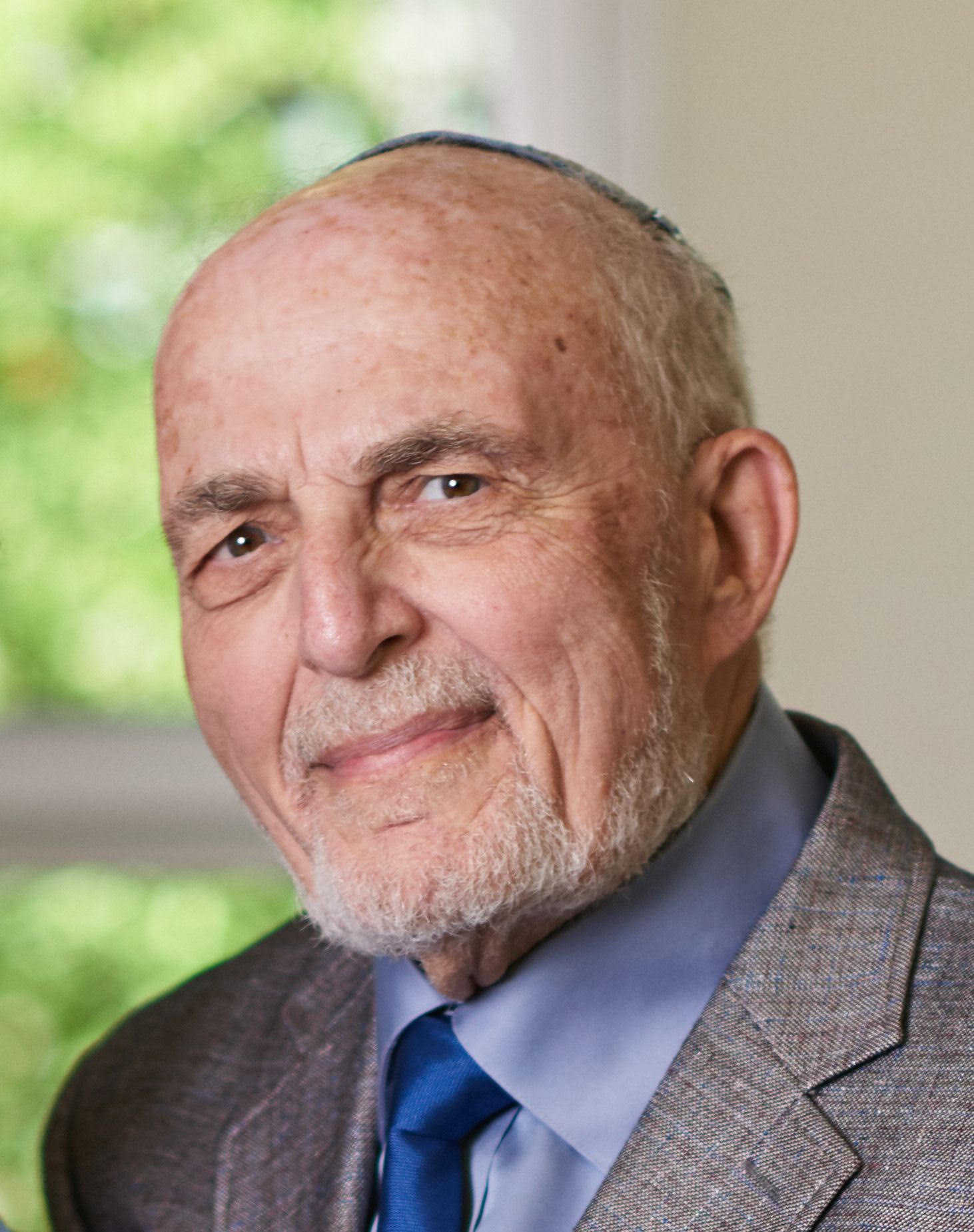
- Aaron Klieman
- Born: July 27, 1939; United States
- Died: June 17, 2021 (aged 82)
- Education: The Johns Hopkins University
- Spouse: Adrian Klieman
- Children: Aliza (Marriott), Amram, Itamar and Yocheved (Shiber)

Aaron (Aharon) S. Klieman (Hebrew: אהרן קליימן; July 27, 1939 – June 17, 2021) was an American-born Israeli historian of international relations who developed the field of international affairs in Israel and abroad. Klieman researched a wide variety of fields in political science including history, arms sales, and geopolitics. He was the Dr. Nahum Goldmann Chair in Diplomacy and lecturer on international relations in the Department of Political Science at Tel-Aviv University, and was the founding director of the Abba Eban Graduate Program in Diplomatic Studies. A native of Chicago, Illinois, his PhD is from The Johns Hopkins University School of Advanced International Studies, with an M.A. from the School of International Affairs at Columbia University in Middle Eastern studies.

Klieman wrote and edited 24 books, monographs, and documentary collections in English and Hebrew, and has authored over 30 book chapters in addition to journal articles. He was also a senior editor of the Israel Journal of Foreign Affairs.

== Academic career ==
In 1969 Klieman accepted an offer from Tel Aviv University to join as a lecturer in the Department of Political Science, eventually becoming the head of the department. He taught a wide variety of undergraduate and graduate courses for more than 50 years. Klieman initiated the "Round Table - Ambassadors Forum", which holds periodic meetings between ambassadors to Israel and students in the department while creating a bridge between them and exposing students to diplomats from Israel and the world. In addition, he established the "International Forum" - an apolitical forum open to students, faculty, and the general public to address core issues in Israeli relations and the international arena. In 2001, Klieman founded and headed the "Abba Eben Program of Graduate Studies in Diplomacy."

Klieman was appointed the Nahum Goldmann Chair in Diplomacy Studies at Tel Aviv University between the years 1997–2009. He was a research fellow at the Moshe Dayan Center and at the JCSS – Jaffee Center for Strategic Studies (now INSS) at Tel Aviv University. He was the first professor from the State of Israel in the Department of Government at Georgetown University in Washington D.C., (1979–1980; 1984–1985), and continued teaching summer courses there for 30 years. In addition, he was a guest lecturer at the Universities of Chicago (1994–1995), Denver (1997), Michigan (Ann Arbor) (2000–2001), California (UCLA) (2005–2006), Brown (2008) and Trinity College (Ireland) (2010).

He was also a supporter of and active in "Track II diplomacy," informal meetings between Israeli representatives and representatives from Arab countries and the Palestinian Authority through an academic channel. Negotiations between Israelis and Palestinians also concerned him.

Upon his retirement in 2007, Klieman established the Department of Politics and Government at Ashkelon Academic College bringing high-level academics to the periphery in Israel.

== Published works ==
- America, the Balance of Power, and the post-1945 World Order, The Jerusalem Strategic Tribune, September–October, 2021, pages 10–22, number 1. Washington, D.C.- Jerusalem, Israel
- First Among the Nations? A Cautionary against Triumphalism in Israeli Foreign Policy, The Israel Journal of Foreign Affairs, Volume Fifteen, 2021, 5781, Number One, Routledge. pages 3–20.
- Routledge Handbook on Israeli Security, co-editor with Professor Stuart A. Cohen, Routledge Publishers, 2019
- Great Powers & Geopolitics in a Rebalancing World. Editor, (Springer, 2015) ISBN 978-3-319-16289-8
- Global Politics. Essays on Contemporary Jewish History and Diplomacy in Honor of Professor David Vital. With Professor Abraham Ben-Zvi. Frank Cass, 2001 ISBN 9780714681818
- Compromising Palestine. A Guide to Final Status Negotiations. Columbia University Press, 2000 ISBN 0231117884
- Constructive Ambiguity in Middle East Peace-Making. The Tami Steinmetz Center for Peace Research, 1999 ISBN 9657001153
- Security Concerns. Insights From The Israeli Experience. Daniel Bar-Tal, Dan Jacobson and Aharon Klieman (eds.). JAI Press, 1998 ISBN 978-0762304684
- Democracy: The Challenges Ahead. Co-editor, with Yossi Shain. Macmillan, 1997 ISBN 978-1-349-25776-8
- Approaching the Finish Line: The United States in Post-Oslo Peace Making, Bar Ilan University: BESA Center for Strategic Studies, monograph in its Mideast Security and Policy Studies series, No. 22, June 1995 ISSN 0793-1042
- The Gulf Crisis and its Global Aftermath. Co-editor, with Gad Barzilai and Gil Shidlo. Routledge, 1993 Reissued (2016) ISBN 9781138184008
- Deterrence in the Middle East, Where Theory and Practice Converge, Co-editor with Ariel Levite, published by JCSS, Jaffee Center for Strategic Studies, 1993 ISBN 9780813322209
- A Double-Edged Sword. Israeli Defense Exports in the 1990s. Am Oved, 1992 (in Hebrew)
- Rearming Israel: Defense Procurement through the 1990s, published by JCSS, Jaffee Center for Strategic Studies, 1991 ISBN 0367285118
- Israel and the World After Forty Years. Pergamon-Brassey's, 1990 ISBN 0080349420
- Statecraft in the Dark: Israel's Practice of Quiet Diplomacy, Westview Press, June 1988 ISBN 0813307171
- Israel and Jordan: Coexistence Without Peace. Maariv Publishing House, 1986
- Israel's Global Reach. Arms Sales as Diplomacy. Pergamon - Brassey's, 1985 ISBN 0080319246
- Israel Arms Sales: Perspectives and Prospects, published by JCSS, Jaffee Center for Strategic Studies, February 1984
- Divide or Rule. Britain's Attempt at Partitioning Palestine, 1936–1939. Ben-Zvi Institute, 1983
- Israel, Jordan, Palestine: The Search for a Durable Peace, The Georgetown University Center for Strategic and International Studies, Sage Publications, 1981 ISBN 0803916841
- Emergency Politics: The Growth of Crisis Government. The London Institute for the Study of Conflict, 1976 ISBN 0903366444
- Soviet Russia and the Middle East. The Johns Hopkins Press, 1970 ISBN 0801811929
- Foundations of British Policy in the Arab World. The Johns Hopkins Press, 1970 ISBN 0801811252
- When Israelis and Palestinians Negotiate. A Practitioner's Handbook. Institute for Diplomacy and Regional Cooperation, Tel-Aviv University (unpublished)
- Square One: The Great Palestine Divide, 1937 and Since (unfinished manuscript)
- Jewish Statecraft: Reflections on Jewish International Relations and Diplomacy (unfinished manuscript)

=== Edited documentary collections ===
- American Zionism. A Documentary History (with Adrian L. Klieman), Fifteen volumes. Garland Publishing, 1991
- The Rise of Israel. A Documentary Record from the Nineteenth Century to 1948, Fourteen volumes. Garland Publishing, 1987
- Letters and Papers of Chaim Weizmann. Vol. 23 (edited and annotated, with introductory chapter). Transaction Books and Israel Universities Press. 340 pp., 1980
- Letters and Papers of Chaim Weizmann. Vol. 18 (edited and annotated, with introductory chapter). Transaction Books and Israel Universities Press. 513 pp., 1979

=== Articles in encyclopedias ===
- Encyclopedia of World Biography, Entries on Shimon Peres, Yitzhak Rabin, Yitzhak Shamir, Ariel Sharon, Ezer Weizman
- "Arms Sales", pp. 47–79. Political Dictionary of the State of Israel, Susan Hattis Rolef (Ed.), MacMillan, 1987
- Political Dictionary of the Middle East in the Twentieth Century, Yaakov Shimoni and Evyatar Levine (ed.), 1972. British Interests and Policies in the Middle East, pp. 79–84 & Russian Interests and Policies in the Middle East, pp. 330– 333
