= MiRGator =

miRGator

Content
- Description: functional annotation of microRNAs.

Contact
- Research center: Ewha Womans University
- Laboratory: Division of Life and Pharmaceutical Sciences
- Authors: Seungyoon Nam
- Primary citation: Nam & al. (2008)
- Release date: 2007

Access
- Website: http://genome.ewha.ac.kr/miRGator/

MiRGator is a database for the functional annotation of miRNAs.

== See also ==
- MiRNA
- Gene silencing
