= Genome Research Foundation =

Genome Research Foundation(게놈연구재단) also known as Genome Foundation is a non-profit research foundation and institute in Korea under the approval of the ministry of Education, Science, and Technology of Korea. It is a public research foundation with over 30 researchers and staff in 2011. It is a government accredited public charity organization.

GRF was established on 19 April 2010 and since then it has taken research in genomics and bioinformatics. Its main research institute is PGI (Personal Genomics Institute) which performs research in genomics area for the general public and by the general public. In 2017, GRF has established a Cardiovasculomics Institute (CVI) to research on the omics of cardiovascular diseases as a sister institute of PGI.

== Research in GRF ==
- KoVariome: The Korean Reference Database of Variome. 2018

== Projects of GRF ==
- The Korean Genome Project: KGP KGP home page
- KoVariome: The Korean Reference Variome KoVariome Homepage

== Organization of GRF ==
- Personal Genomics Institute
- Geromics Institute
- Cardiovascularomics Institute
