= Korean Bioinformation Center =

Korean national research centre in bioinformatics

Korean Bioinformation Center (KOBIC)
- Company type: Research Center
- Industry: Bioinformatics
- Headquarters: Daejeon, South Korea
- Key people: Founding director: Jong Bhak

The Korean Bioinformation Center (KOBIC) is the Korean national research centre in bioinformatics, based in Daejeon, South Korea. The centre is comparable to the National Center for Biotechnology Information (NCBI) in the United States and the European Bioinformatics Institute (EBI) in Europe and plays a key role in various areas such as genomics, proteomics, systems biology, and personalized medicine.

The research centre was originally established as the National Genome Information Center (NGIC) in 2001. It was designated as the National Center for Registration of Research Results in 2003 and gained its current name in 2006 by the NGIC director Jong Bhak who passed a bill to establish the national center for bioresource, biodiversity, and bioinformation. Prof. Jong Bhak coined the name KOGIC in 2005 and the formalization of the name was carried out by the vice prime minister Prof. Woosik Kim in 2006. KOBIC was designated as the National Center for Biological Research Resource Information in 2010. KOBIC is affiliated with the Korea Research Institute of Bioscience and Biotechnology (KRIBB).

As a national bioinformation management centre, KOBIC manages biological data from a number of different sources, with an emphasis on omics data.

Research at KOBIC has an emphasis on next-generation sequencing methods, systems bioinformatics, biomedical informatics and structural informatics. Notable databases and tools provided by KOBIC include the MiRGator database for the functional annotation of miRNAs and Patome, a database of biological sequence data of issued patents and/or published patent applications. Researchers at KOBIC have also been involved in the analysis for the Korean Reference Genome Project. The Korean Reference Genome Project was initiated by the then director Jong Bhak who made a formal collaboration with National Standard Reference Center of KRISS, Daejeon, Korea in 2006. The first project under the Korean Reference Genome Project was KOREF. As it was expensive to build a reference genome in 2006, Jong Bhak made a collaboration with Gacheon Cancer and Diabetes Institute led by Dr. Kim, Seong Jin (SJK) and the first KOREF was SJK genome that was sequenced by Illumina GA2 sequencer.
