= List of conferences in Cairo =

List of conferences in Cairo

- Cairo Conference (1921), the British government conference following World War I which established the British policy for the Middle East
- The two World War II conferences in 1943 which established the Allied war strategy in Asia, codenamed Sextant:
  - Cairo Conference (1943)
  - Second Cairo Conference of 1943
- 1961 Preparatory Meeting of the Non-Alignment Countries (1961)
- 2nd Summit of the Non-Aligned Movement (1964)
- International Conference on Population and Development of 1994
- Various Arab League summits held in Cairo:
  - 1964 Arab League summit (Cairo)
  - 1970 Arab League summit
  - 1976 Arab League summit (Cairo)

== See also ==
- Cairo Declaration on Human Rights in Islam (1990)
