= List of human genetics conferences =

National and international associations and societies for human genetics host regular meetings to advance human genetics in science, health, and society through excellence in research, education, and advocacy.

Hosting society	Time of the year	Location	Participants
ASHG	October	USA	>4,000
ACMG	April	USA	>3,000
AfSHG	Varies	Africa (location varies)	>500
ESHG	June	Europe	>4000
GfH	March	Germany	>800
HGSA	August	Australasia	>500
AGD	December	Germany	>500
ICHG	February (Quinquennial)	World	>5,000
SASHG	September (Biennial)	South Africa	>200
