= Cairo Conference (1921) =

Conference regarding British policy for the Middle East

Report of the Cairo Conference

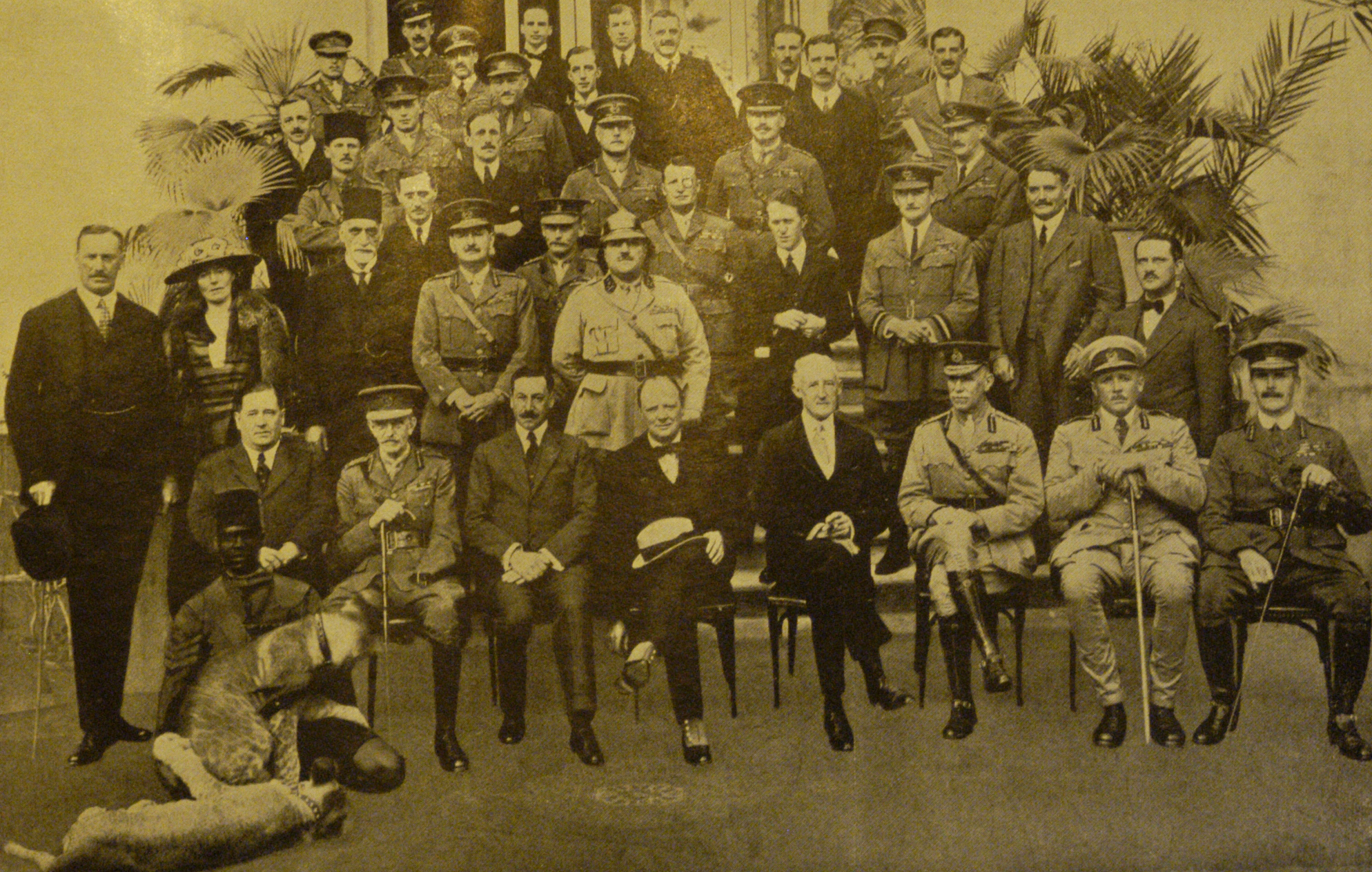
The delegates with lion cubs at left, and T. E. Lawrence in the second row, fourth from right in a dark suit

The 1921 Cairo Conference, described in its official minutes as the Middle East Conference held in Cairo and Jerusalem, March 12 to 30, 1921, was a series of meetings held by British officials to examine and discuss problems in the Middle East and to frame a common policy. The secret conference of British experts created the blueprint for British control in both Iraq and the Transjordan region. By offering nominal leadership of those two regions to the sons of the Sharif of Mecca, Winston Churchill felt that the spirit, if not the actual letter, of Britain's wartime promises to the Arabs had been fulfilled.

Particular concerns of the conference included discussing the conflicting policies defined in the McMahon–Hussein Correspondence (1915), the Sykes–Picot Agreement (1916) and the Balfour Declaration (1917). Churchill, the newly-appointed Colonial Secretary, called all British military Leaders and civil administrators in the Middle East to a conference at the Semiramis Hotel in Cairo to discuss those issues. It was an experimental conference organized by the Colonial Office, with the purpose to solve problems more efficiently by the improved communications without protracted correspondence.

The conference's most significant outcome was the decision to implement the Sharifian Solution: Abdullah bin Hussein was to administer the territory east of the Jordan River, Transjordan, and his brother Faisal was to become king of the newly-created Kingdom of Iraq; both were to continue to receive direction and financial support from Britain. It was also agreed that Lebanon and Syria should remain under French control, Britain was to maintain the mandate over Palestine west of the Jordan River and to continue supporting the establishment of a Jewish Homeland there; and Hussein, the Sharif of Mecca, was to be recognised as King of the Hejaz; and Abdul Aziz ibn Saud was to be left in control of the Najd, in the heart of the Arabian Desert.

== Background ==
In 1920, a popular uprising had broken out in Mesopotamia, which had been occupied by the British since the First World War. The British Army had suffered hundreds of casualties. and sections of the British press were calling for the ending of British control. T. E. Lawrence, whose wartime activities were beginning to capture the public imagination and who had strong attachments to Husein's dynasty, based in the Hejaz, was lobbying the British government on behalf of Emir Faisal. The Emir's attempt to establish a kingdom with Damascus as its capital had been thwarted by the French Army. In November 1920, Faisal's older brother Abdullah appeared with several hundred followers in the town of Ma'an and announced his intentions to attack the French occupation in what are now Syria and Lebanon and restore his brother to power there.

Winston Churchill's task as the new Colonial Secretary, with special responsibility for the Middle East, was to find a solution to the unrest in Iraq and satisfy the aspirations of the Huseins and appointed Lawrence as his special advisor. They held a series of meetings with Faisal in London prior to the conference.

Most of the decisions about the future of Iraq had been already taken in London. Faisal should become king of the new Kingdom of Iraq, to be approved by a plebiscite of the local population. Once installed, the King would sign a treaty of friendship or alliance with Britain. In a major policy change, which Lawrence had argued strongly in favour, it was decided that security in the area should be transferred from the British Army to the Royal Air Force. When the conference had started, the British army had managed to crush the revolt in Mesopotamia at a cost of £40–50 million, with over 400 British soldiers and over 10,000 Iraqis killed. It was anticipated that the new policy would make significant financial savings.

== Conference ==
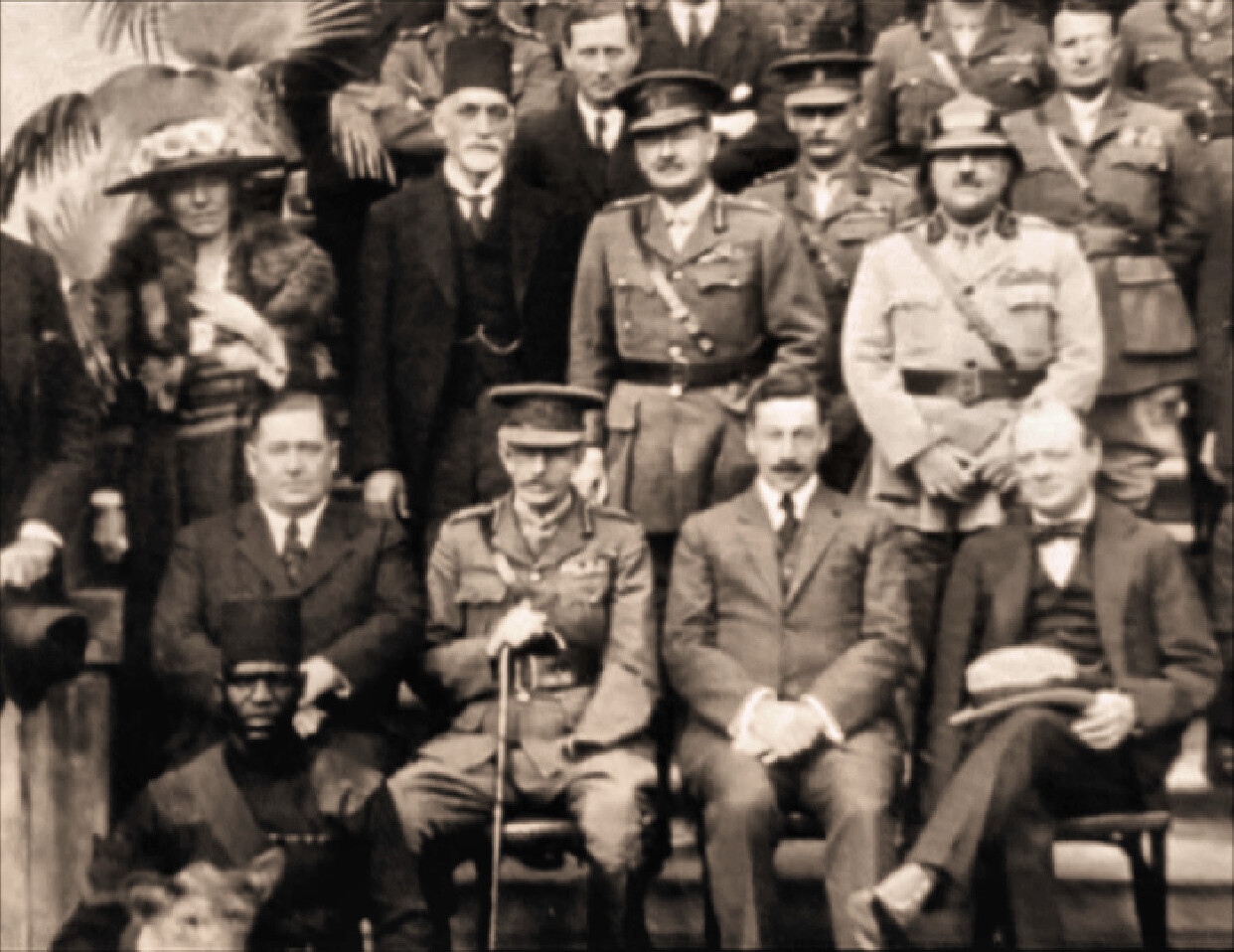
Seated: from right: Winston Churchill, Herbert Samuel Standing first row: from left: Gertrude Bell, Sir Sassoon Eskell, Field Marshal Edmund Allenby, Jafar Pasha al-Askari

On 12 March 1921, the conference was convened at the Semiramis Hotel in Cairo and was attended by all the senior military and civil figures from Palestine and Mesopotamia. Both Arabs who were present were members of the Mesopotamian Mandate administration. Churchill described the gathering, which lasted two weeks, as one of "Forty Thieves" and spent his leisure time practising his new hobby of oil painting and working on the manuscript of his history of the First World War, The World Crisis.

The agenda consisted of three sections: Iraq, Palestine (including Transjordan), Aden and the Persian Gulf. The Judiciary, Finance, the size of the British Army garrison and the proposed Legislative Council were all on the agenda. An Arab delegation from Palestine met Churchill in Cairo briefly on 22 March, but he refused to discuss anything political though he agreed to meet again in Jerusalem. The issue of Transjordania was complicated by the arrival of Abdullah's army in Amman, with an influx of rebels and refugees from Syria and the fact that the Zionists regarded Transjordan as part of the promised Jewish homeland. Churchill held a series of meetings with Abdullah in Jerusalem on his way back to London.

The only public announcement on the decisions that was made during the conference was a report made by Winston Churchill to the British House of Commons on 14 June 1921. It drew little comment from the press, and the conference was barely mentioned in the published letters and autobiographies of the main participants.

== Jerusalem meetings ==
On 24 March 1921, the Palestine mission continued its work in Jerusalem. In Gaza, Churchill's train was met by a large demonstration against the British Mandate for Palestine. He met the Mayor of Gaza and other leaders and was presented with a list of demands, which had been put forward by the Muslim-Christian Associations in Haifa. Churchill and Herbert Samuel supposed that they were being welcomed by the inhabitants and so they waved to the protesting crowds, who were chanting anti-Jewish slogans.

=== Meeting with Emir Abdullah ===
On 28 March,Churchill had several meetings with Emir Abdullah, who had already established himself in Amman and was threatening to proceed further northwards. Churchill proposed to constitute Transjordan as an Arab province under an Arab governor, who would recognise British control over his Administration and be responsible to the High Commissioners for Palestine and Transjordan. Abdullah argued that he should be given control of the entire area of Mandatatory Palestine responsible to the High Commissioner. Alternatively, he advocated a union with Iraq, the territory that was promised to his brother. Churchill rejected both demands.

Responding to Abdullah's fear for a Jewish kingdom west of the Jordan, Churchill decreed that it was not contemplated "that hundreds and thousands of Jews were going to pour into the country in a very short time and dominate the existing population" but even that it was quite impossible: "Jewish immigration would be a very slow process and the rights of the existing non-Jewish population would be strictly preserved" He also stated, "Trans-Jordania would not be included in the present administrative system of Palestine, and therefore the Zionist clauses of the mandate would not apply. Hebrew would not be made an official language in Trans-Jordania, and the local Government would not be expected to adopt any measures to promote Jewish immigration and colonisation". About British policy in Palestine, Samuel added, "There was no question of setting up a Jewish Government there.... No land would be taken from any Arab, nor would the Moslem religion be touched in any way".

The British representatives suggested that if Abdullah's ability to control the anti-French actions of the Syrian nationalists would reduce French opposition to his brother's candidature for Mesopotamia and might even lead to the appointment of Abdullah himself as Emir of Syria in Damascus. In the end, Abdullah agreed to halting his advance towards the French and administering the territory east of the Jordan River for a six-month trial period during which he would be given a British subsidy of £5,000 per month.

=== Meeting with Palestinian Arab delegation ===
After the conversations with the Emir, Churchill met a delegation of the 1920 Haifa Congress that represented Palestinian Muslims and Christians and was led by Musa al-Husayni. They handed over a memorandum, which sounded a strong protest against British policies in Palestine. They complained that Britain, "under the financial stress of the war, had sold their country to Zionists". They added that England, "disregarding the feelings of the inhabitants, has appointed a Jew as High Commissioner" despite "the fact that the predominating majority of the people he governs are not of his own race or faith". They also stated, "To the most important post of justice in Palestine, namely that of Legal Secretary, or Minister of Justice, a Jew has been appointed. And what is worse, this official is an out and out Zionist".

The delegation contested the legal validity of the Balfour Declaration, which had staked the historical claims of the Jews, according to the logic of which "the Arabs should claim Spain since once upon a time they conquered it and there developed a high civilisation". They criticised charged customs and trade competition and warned of Zionists dominating the market. They protested the buying up of lands, which they criticized as costly, "less than necessary projects to employ Jewish immigrants at double salaries, though doing less works, at a cost to public education. Also, "the highest posts with fat salaries are given to the Jews", the delegates complained, "while the native official, who is more conversant with local needs, is relegated to a third-class position, with a salary too little for his needs and out of all proportion with his work".

The delegation objected to the draft Mandate for Palestine, which added nothing to Arab rights that were already derived from existing law but gave the Btitish the right to hand Crown lands that are not their ownover to the Jews that are not their own. "On the other hand, the Jews have been granted a true advantage, namely, that of becoming our rulers". The delegation called for the rescinding of the Balfour Declaration, the establishment of an elected Parliament and the suspension of Jewish immigration.

In reply to the statement, Churchill called the paper partisan and one-sided and with a great many untrue statements. As the Balfour Declaration had been ratified by the Allied Powers, it was an established fact. The National Home for the Jews would be "good for the world, good for the Jews and good for the British Empire... good for the Arabs who dwell in Palestine". He emphasised that Balfour had spoken of "the establishment in Palestine of a National Home for the Jews" and had not stated that he would make Palestine "the National Home for the Jews". The declaration "does not mean that it will cease to be the National Home of other people, or that a Jewish Government will be set up to dominate the Arab people". The British government "cherish a strong friendship and desire for co-operation with the Arab race as a whole. That is what you would expect from the British Empire, which is the greatest of all the Muslem States in the world...". Churchill continued his speech by explaining the appointment as High Commissioner of Samuel to be caused by his training and experience. Because he was a Jew, "in holding the balance even and securing fair tradement for all he could not be reproached for being hostile to his own people, and he was believed by them when he said that he was only doing what was just and fair".

Samuel then spoke of the great advantages the Jewish immigration brought to Palestine as a whole. He refused to promise any changes to British policy.

=== Meeting with Jewish National Council ===
The Jewish National Council, representing the Palestinian Jews, presented a memorandum to Churchill that expressed gratitude towards Britain for supporting "the rebuilding of the Jewish National Home" and trusted that its realisation would "be made possible by giving Palestine its historical frontiers". Its declared that "by our efforts to rebuild the Jewish National Home, which is but a small area in comparison with all the Arab lands, we do not deprive them of their legitimate rights". The declaration lauded the results of the Jewish colonisation in the past forty years. It asked to charge the Jewish people with the development of state lands and non-private uncultivated lands and the development of the country's natural resources.

The Imperial Cabinet was "perfectly convinced that the cause of Zionism is one which carries with it much that is good for the whole world, and not only for the Jewish people, but that it will also bring with it prosperity and contentment and advancement to the Arab population of this country". He believed "that you were animated by the very highest spirit of justice and idealism, and that your work would in fact confer blessings upon the whole country". Zionists should be forewarned to anticipate adverse criticism from the majority population. The Colonial Secretary concluded that he had read the memorandum "with great interest and sympathy".

=== Churchill's speech at the Hebrew University of Jerusalem ===
On 29 March 1921, Churchill made a speech at the Hebrew University of Jerusalem. He unveiled that his heart was full of sympathy for Zionism for twelve years ago, since he had met the Manchester Jews. Once more, he reiterated the blessings of a Jewish national home for the whole world, the Jewish race and Great Britain. the inhabitants of Palestine would greatly depend on its auditors, the Jews of Palestine. By taking the right steps. Palestine would transform into a paradise as foretold in the scriptures, "a land flowing with milk and honey, in which sufferers of all races and religions will find a rest from their sufferings".

== Aftermath ==
T. E. Lawrence concluded that Churchill had "made straight all the tangle" and that Britain had fulfilled its "promises in letter and spirit... without sacrificing any interest of our Empire or any interest of the people concerned". One of Lawrence's biographers comments that the conference "heralded a period of unrest in the Middle East which had scarcely been surpassed even under Ottoman rule".

== Participants ==
- Winston Churchill - Secretary of State for the Colonies
- T. E. Lawrence - Special Advisor to Colonial Office
- Maj. Hubert Winthrop Young - Colonial Office
- Herbert Samuel - High Commissioner of Palestine
- Sir Percy Cox - High Commissioner of Iraq
- Gertrude Bell - Oriental Secretary for High Commissioner of Iraq
- Ja'afar al'Askari - Minister of Defence in the first Government of Iraq
- Air Marshal Sir Hugh Trenchard - Chief of the Air Staff
- Air Vice-Marshal Sir Geoffrey Salmond - Air Officer Commanding Middle East
- Sasun Hasqail - Minister of Finance in the first Government of Iraq
- Geoffrey Francis Archer - Governor British Somalia
- Field Marshal Edmund Allenby - High Commissioner of Egypt

== See also ==
- Cairo Conference (disambiguation)
- Sharifian Solution
- Emirate of Transjordan
- Kingdom of Iraq (Mandate administration)
- Mandatory Palestine
