= 1971 in Jordan =

- Decades: 1950s; 1960s; 1970s; 1980s; 1990s
- See also: Other events of 1971; Timeline of Jordanian history

Events from the year 1971 in Jordan.

== Incumbents ==
- Monarch: Hussein
- Prime Minister: Wasfi al-Tal (until 29 November), Ahmad al-Lawzi (starting 29 November)

== Events ==
- Black September in Jordan

== See also ==
- Years in Iraq
- Years in Syria
- Years in Saudi Arabia
