= 1974 in Jordan =

- Decades: 1950s; 1960s; 1970s; 1980s; 1990s
- See also: Other events of 1974; Timeline of Jordanian history

Events from the year 1974 in Jordan.

== Incumbents ==
- Monarch: Hussein
- Prime Minister: Ahmad al-Lawzi (until 26 May), Zaid al-Rifai (starting 26 May)

== Births ==
- May 3 - Princess Haya bint Al Hussein

== See also ==
- Years in Iraq
- Years in Syria
- Years in Saudi Arabia
