= 1975 in Jordan =

- Decades: 1950s; 1960s; 1970s; 1980s; 1990s
- See also: Other events of 1975; Timeline of Jordanian history

Events from the year 1975 in Jordan.

== Incumbents ==
- Monarch: Hussein
- Prime Minister: Zaid al-Rifai

== Events ==
- VAPCO manufacturing company is established in Amman.

== Births ==
- 6 February - Sufian Abdullah.

== See also ==
- Years in Iraq
- Years in Syria
- Years in Saudi Arabia
