= 1979 in Jordan =

- Decades: 1950s; 1960s; 1970s; 1980s; 1990s
- See also: Other events of 1979; Timeline of Jordanian history

Events from the year 1979 in Jordan.

== Incumbents ==
- Monarch: Hussein
- Prime Minister: Mudar Badran (until 19 December), Abdelhamid Sharaf (starting 19 December)

== Births ==
- 21 June - Fadi Shaheen

== See also ==
- Years in Iraq
- Years in Syria
- Years in Saudi Arabia
