= 1970 in Jordan =

- Decades: 1950s; 1960s; 1970s; 1980s; 1990s
- See also: Other events of 1970; Timeline of Jordanian history

Events from the year 1970 in Jordan.

== Incumbents ==
- Monarch: Hussein
- Prime Minister:
  - until 27 June: Bahjat Talhouni
  - 27 June-16 September: Abdelmunim al-Rifai
  - 16 September-26 September: Mohammad Daoud Al-Abbasi
  - 26 September-28 October: Ahmad Toukan
  - starting 28 October: Wasfi al-Tal

== Events ==
- Black September in Jordan - Civil war
- Dawson's Field hijackings

== See also ==
- Years in Iraq
- Years in Syria
- Years in Saudi Arabia
