= 1976 in Jordan =

- Decades: 1950s; 1960s; 1970s; 1980s; 1990s
- See also: Other events of 1976; Timeline of Jordanian history

Events from the year 1976 in Jordan.

== Incumbents ==
- Monarch: Hussein
- Prime Minister: Zaid al-Rifai (until 13 July), Mudar Badran (starting 13 July)

== Births ==
- Saba Mubarak

== Deaths ==
- Suleiman Nabulsi

== See also ==
- Years in Iraq
- Years in Syria
- Years in Saudi Arabia
