= Mustafa Wahbi Tal =

Jordanian poet, teacher and civil servant (1899–1949)

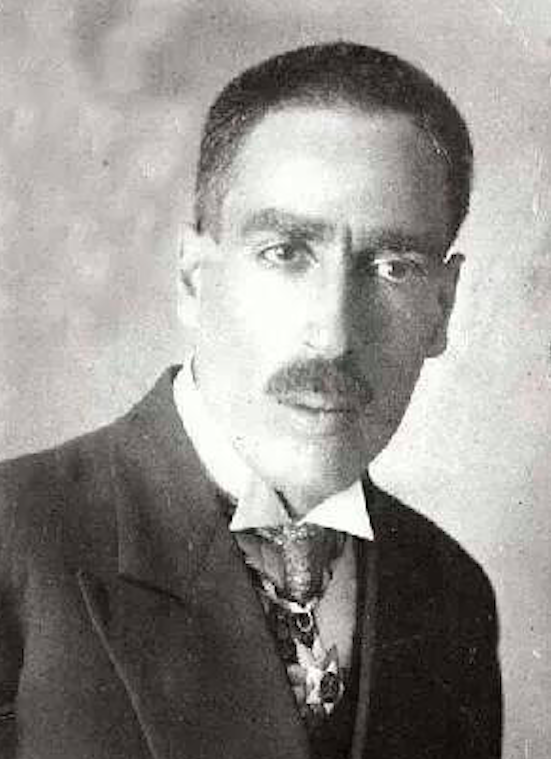
- Tal in the late 1930s
- Born: 25 May 1899; Irbid, Ottoman Empire
- Died: 24 May 1949 (aged 49); Amman, Jordan
- Occupations: Poet; writer; civil servant; teacher
- Spouses: Munifa Baban (m. 1918) Shoma Harb Dhyat (m. 1925; div. 1925) Oufa' Al-Jabr (m. 1933) Adwieh 'Araj (m. 1943; div. 1944)
- Children: Wasfi Tal; Mou'een Tal; Maryoud Tal; Sa'eed Tal; Shaker Tal; Abdallah Tal; Safieh Tal; Sayel Tal; Alieh Tal; Taha Tal
- Writing career
- Pen name: Arar
- Language: Arabic
- Notable works: 'Ashiyyat Wadi Al-Yabis; Bil Rafah Wal Banin; Al 'A'imma Fe Quraish; Rubaiyat of Omar Khayyam translation

Mustafa Wahbi Tal (Arabic: مصطفى وهبي التل, romanized: Muṣṭafa Wahbī al-Tall; 25 May 1899 – 24 May 1949), also known by his pen name Arar (Arabic: عرار, romanized: ‘Arār), was a Jordanian poet, writer, teacher and civil servant, widely regarded as Jordan's most prominent poet and among the best-known Jordanian poets among Arab readers.

Born in Irbid in the Ottoman Empire on 25 May 1899, Tal completed his elementary education in his hometown, later leaving to complete his high school education in Damascus. His rebellious and stubborn temperament would appear as early as his high school years in Damascus, when he would be exiled several times by the Ottoman authorities for participating in school strikes. In his adulthood, Tal would be imprisoned and exiled several times for democratic activism or for insulting high-ranking officials by the governments of the Arab Kingdom of Syria, and, after its downfall, by the government of the Emirate of Transjordan.

His first job was in Karak, Transjordan, as an Arabic literature teacher. Later Tal would be appointed as Administrative Governor of Wadi Al-Seer and Shoubak in the 1920s. After earning a law degree in 1930, he would hold several positions in the judiciary before being appointed as Chief of Protocol at the Emir's Court. Tal then was laid off from his job and imprisoned for 70 days after an altercation with a Prime Minister serving during that time. This would be the latest in a series of exiles and imprisonments he faced throughout his life. Tal became desperate and his alcoholism worsened, contributing to his death on 24 May 1949.

Tal's relationship with the nomadic Dom (gypsy) community in Transjordan, which are called Nawar in Arabic, influenced much of his poetry, whereas he named his only poetry collection, Ashiyyat Wadi Al-Yabis, in reference to the festive nights he spent with the Nawar and to a Nawari woman he loved. Tal found justice, equality and lack of classism among the Nawari community, which he thought was lacking in Transjordan's cities. He reflected these views in many of his poems, as well as venerating the lands of Jordan, and at other times vehemently criticizing its government's policies. He also wrote poems dedicated to criticizing British policies which supported Zionism in Palestine along with British colonial officers in Transjordan, while other poems he wrote venerated alcohol and were about women.

Tal is Jordan's most celebrated poet. The country's most illustrious literary award is named after him, and his hometown of Irbid holds an annual literary festival in his name. The house where he used to live in Irbid was turned into a museum that welcomes hundreds of visitors annually. He was married four times, two of which ended in divorce. He had ten children. His eldest son Wasfi Tal was Jordan's Prime Minister for several tenures during the late 1960s and early 1970s until his assassination in 1971.

== Biography ==
=== Early life ===
Mustafa Wahbi Tal was born in Irbid, Syria Vilayet, Ottoman Empire on 25 May 1899 to an illiterate father and a mother that was "blasphemously stubborn" according to his friend and biographer Ya'qoub Al-Oudat. He was named Mustafa as namesake of his grandfather and Wahbi was added to his birth name per Ottoman tradition. From a young age, Tal suffered from Rhotacism, a speech impediment characterized in the inability to pronounce 'r' sounds. His family were Sunni Muslims, descended from the Bani Zaydan tribe which migrated from Najd in Arabia to the Levant around the 18th century; his family was called Tal because a member of the tribe, Yousef Abbas, had settled in Amman, next the city's Citadel, which was built on a hill or 'tal' in Arabic. Three decades later they relocated to Irbid and remained there.

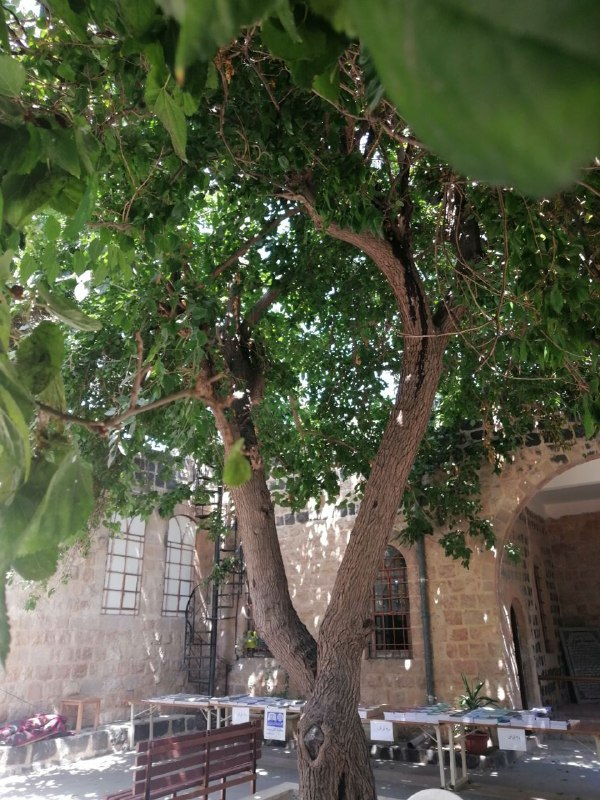
The patio of Tal's family house in Irbid which was turned into a museum in 1989 after his grave was relocated there. The museum receives hundreds of visitors annually.

Tal finished his elementary school education in Irbid in 1911. In 1912, Tal headed to the Anbur School in Damascus. After two or three years of studying there, he participated with his classmates in a strike protesting against the Ottomans' policies in the region. During the strike, the Ottoman governor of Damascus Ismail Fazıl Pasha, the Turkish Education Principal, and State Inspector General Sheikh Abdul Jalil Al-Durrah visited the school. After the Sheikh finished his speech, Tal made his way between the students, stood in the middle of the campus and shouted while pointing at the Sheikh: "This man is a charlatan liar!" According to Al-Oudat, it was this incident and the ones that followed them that made Tal known to the Ottoman authorities of being a student fond of "messing around and creating chaos during lessons, so much that the Turkish teachers called him a field mouse."

=== Adulthood ===
Tal returned for a summer vacation in his hometown of Irbid in 1916. The stubbornness he inherited from his mother was beginning to impact his relationship with his father who refused to let him return to continue his studies in Damascus. Instead his father kept him in Irbid to work in the private school which he founded, the Ottoman Salihhya School. On 20 June 1917, Tal and his friend Mohammad Subhi Abu Ghnaimeh headed to the capital of the Empire, Istanbul, for a visit. On the way, they passed by an area in Turkey named Arapgir where Tal's uncle and his friend's brother lived. Instead of heading to Istanbul, he stayed there and in 1918 he began working for the Eskişehir magazine.

He became bored after five months of working at the magazine and resigned in March 1919. He returned to Irbid in April. He spent the summer there and convinced his father to send him back to the Anbur School in Damascus to complete his high school education. In 1919, he published a joke in the Damascene Brotherhood Magazine owned by Jubran Masuh:

– إذن صديقنا مريض؟
– نعم، مصاب بحصى في كليتيه.
– يظهر أن قلبه انتقل إلى كليتيه.

Translation:

– So our friend is sick today?
– Yes he has kidney stones.
– It appears his heart has made its way to his kidney

Both Tal and Masuh were arrested for this joke. Masuh later understood that Tal's joke was mocking Ali Rikabi, the Military Governor of Arab Kingdom of Syria, which was established in the Levant following the dissolution of the Ottoman Empire toward the end of World War I. In another episode of Tal's rebellious and stubborn temperament, he and the students at Anbur demanded the school principal provide them with military training to fight the French authorities in Syria. The principal told them that those who wanted the military should go volunteer and those who wanted science should stay in the school. Tal told him that he wanted to make the school a military training camp to which his principal replied: "You want it a military training camp with a cigarette in your mouth?" Tal then threw the cigarette so forcefully that it burnt the tip of the principal's pants.

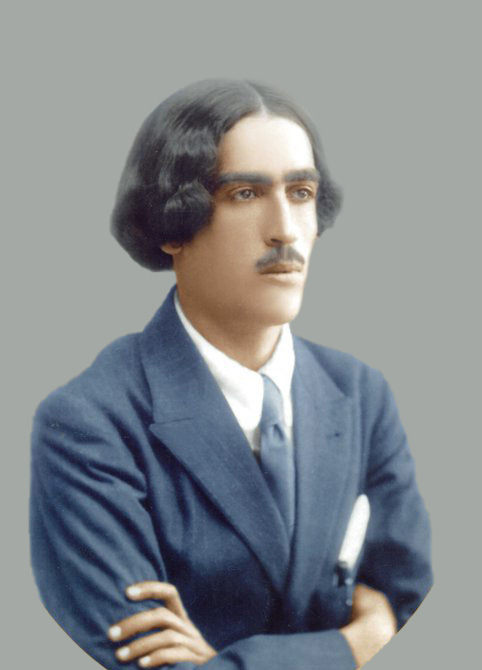
Tal during the 1920s, colorized.

Before graduating, Tal participated in another strike that ended up with his expulsion to Aleppo with his friend Abu Ghnaimeh. During Tal's time in Aleppo he mastered Turkish and learnt some Persian. Al-Oudat stated that it was during his stay in Aleppo that Tal read the Rubaiyat of Persian poet Omar Khayyam and translated Apre La Bataille from French. Tal gained his high school degree from the Aleppo Preparation School.

The Arab Syrian Kingdom was toppled by the French in 1920 and an Emirate over Transjordan was then established in early 1921 by the Hashemite Emir Abdullah of the Hejaz as a British protectorate. Tal returned to Transjordan and worked as an Arabic literature teacher in the city of Karak where he met Al-Oudat for the first time. Al-Oudat wrote in Tal's biography:

On a day in April 1922, I got up from my bed in the city of Karak, perched on the western sword of the desert. A young man with a rectangular face, sharp looks and Bedouin features was being hosted in our house, and he was Mustafa Wahbi Tal Arar (...) What caught my eye on this brown genie: his rakish figure, venerable face, charcoal hair that he sent on his shoulders like Greek philosophers, and a Rhotacism in which he could not make r sounds (...) I joked to Mustafa: Why did you send your hair on your shoulders as if you were Jesus or John the Baptist? He said: I am following the example of Omar Khayyam.

=== Political activism in Transjordan and Palestine ===
In the 1920s, Tal became politically active in Transjordan and Palestine. He began writing articles in the Haifa-based Al-Karmil newspaper owned by Palestinian Christian journalist Nagib Nassar. He wrote political essays, literature, translated stories and news about Transjordan. In 1922, Tal and Nassar began advocating Arab nationalism as they visited Nazareth in 1922, warning there of the dangers of exploiting religion. They also visited Karak to promote pan-Arab unity. He wrote a poem warning about the 1917 Balfour Declaration by the British government promising the Jews a homeland in Palestine

يا رب، إن بلفور أنفذ وعـده
كم مسلم يبقى وكم نصراني؟
وكيان مسجد قريتي من ذا الذي
يبقـي عليه إذا أزيل كيانـي؟
وكنيسـة العذراء أين مكانهـا
وسيكون إن بعث اليهود مكاني؟

Translation:

Oh god if Balfour fulfills his promise
How many Muslims remain and how many Christians?
And will the mosque of my village
stay if my entity is removed?
Where will Virgin Mary's church be
if the Jews replaced me?

=== Participation in Adwan Rebellion ===
In May 1923, Tal was appointed as Administrative Governor of the Wadi Al-Seer area west of Transjordan's capital Amman. He remained in his job until being fired on 8 July 1923, the day in which he was arrested with Auda Qoussous, Shamsudeen Sami, Saleh Najdawi, Ali Sharkasi and other Transjordanian intellectuals who sided with the Adwan tribe during the Adwan Rebellion. The rebellion was started by Sultan Adwan, chief of the tribes of the Balqa (central Transjordan), who was enraged with Emir Abdullah's close alliance with the Bani Sakher tribe, the Adwan tribes' rivals. Adwan was equally angry with the staffing of the Emir's government with Syrians, Lebanese and Palestinians which gained him the sympathy of Transjordanian intellectuals. This led Tal to coin the slogan "Jordan for Jordanians," and calls for democratization in the country. Those arrested were charged with "organizing a secret organization intending to overthrow the regime." Tal was first exiled to Ma'an for 9 months, then Aqaba, and then Jeddah which was then part of the Hashemite Kingdom of Hejaz. After his release, he was appointed as Administrative Governor of Shoubak. Tal later wrote about his exile:

My treatment was not only contrary to the law, justice and fairness, but also out of vanity more or less. I think that God did not create me to be a distraction for the men of the government of Transjordan so that they could exile me and arrest just because they wanted to do so without being able to obtain any evidence against me. I think that spending a year and eight months in prison is painful in every way imaginable, it is so detrimental in a way that cannot be fixed with an amnesty.

Following riots in Wadi Musa village near Shoubak, he was removed from his position. He refused to interrogate the rioters and was accused by the British Representative in Transjordan of being unable to restore order. Two years later he was acquitted from these charges. Tal was appointed as a teacher in 1926 for two months. He was arrested again on the charges of displaying the Bolshevik emblem, becoming inebriated in a public bar, and publicly reciting a poem that insulted the Emir, the Prime Minister, and the law.

=== Relationship with the Dom/Nawar community in Transjordan ===
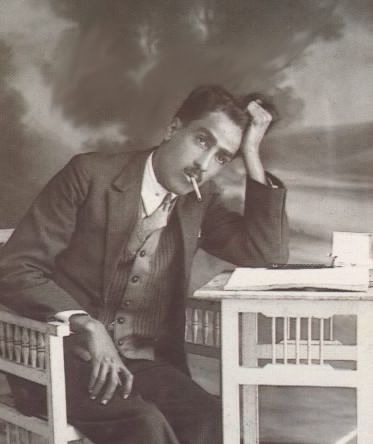
Tal in late 1920s.

Before leaving Shoubak, he began his long-lasting relationship with the nomadic Dom (gypsy) community in Transjordan, which are called Nawar in Arabic. This friendship deepened as spent his nights at their quarters between the areas of Madaba and Ajloun's Wadi Al-Yabis valley with the Nawar's donkeys, Rebabs, dancers and singers. He was so deeply affected by the time he spent with them that he named his only diwan (poetry collection), Ashiyyat Wadi Al-Yabis, which he gifted to a Nawari woman. Tal viewed the Kharabeesh, the tent-like structures where the Nawar people lived, to be places of safety and security where he found the justice and equality that he believed was lacking in Transjordan's cities. He found the Nawar to be marginalized, simple and generous, with no classism. He reflected these views in many of his poems, such as in the following verses:

بين الخرابيش لا حرص ولا طمع
ولا احتراب على فلس ودينـار
بين الخرابيش لا مـال ولا نسب
ولا احتراب على حرص وإيثار
ولا هيــام بألقـاب وأوسمــة
ولا ارتفاع ولا خفض بأقـدار
الكـل زط مســاواة محققــة
تنفي الفوارق بين الجار والجار

Translation:

Between the Kharabeesh there's no eagerness or greed
Nor fights over a fils or a dinar
Between the Kharabeesh there's no money or lineage
Nor fights over eagerness or altruism
No interest in titles or decorations
Nor rise or decrease in worth
All are completely equal
Rejecting differences between neighbors

In another instance, he wrote a long poem titled Al-Oubodyeh Al-Kobra (The Great Slavery) chastising the Irbid Attorney General after he expelled the Nawari community leader Mohammad Al-Fahel (nicknamed Al-Haber) from the courthouse because of his torn and dirty clothes:

يا مدعي عام اللواء وخير من فهم القضية
الهبر جاءك للسلام فكيف تمنعه التحية؟
ألأن كسوته ممزقة وهيئته زرية؟
قد صده جنديك الفظ الغليظ بلا روية
وأبى عليه أن يراك فجاء ممتعضا إلي
...
دع المراسم والرسوم لمن عقولهم شوية
فالهبر مثلي ثم مثلك اردني التابعية

Translation:

Oh Attorney General of the district and he who understood the case well
Al-Haber came to say hello, how can you prevent him from greeting you?
Is it because his clothes are torn and his appearance miserable?
He was pushed away by your rude and mannerless soldier
He refused to see you so he came to me
...
Let the ceremonies and fees for those with a narrow mind
As Al-Haber is like you and me, a Jordanian

=== Opposition to the first Anglo-Transjordanian treaty ===
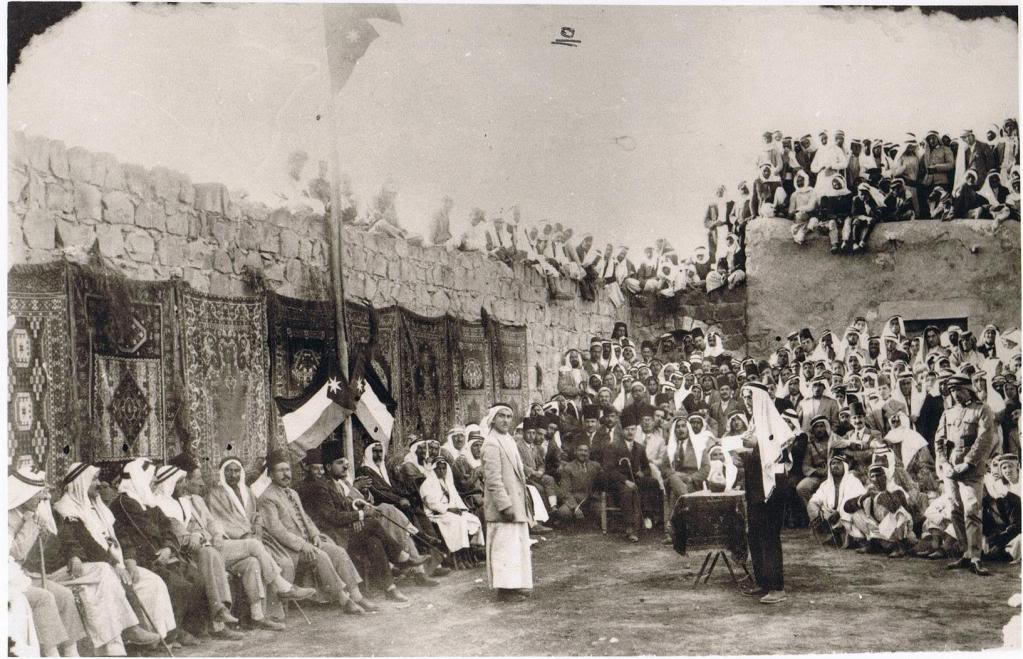
Tal making a speech that discussed Transjordan's political and economic status and warned attendees of British policies in support of Zionism in Palestine which, according to him, aimed to turn it into a Jewish homeland that neglected the rights of the Arab natives during the Third National Conference on 25 May 1930.

In 1927, he was appointed principal of Al Husn School for seven months before resigning due to his active opposition to the Anglo-Transjordanian treaty of 1928, which gave Britain sweeping powers over the Transjordanian state. The government of Transjordan accused Tal of inciting opposition to the treaty among the inhabitants of Ajloun. The Governor of Ajloun then sentenced him to house arrest in Amman for a few months. After he was released, Tal made a speech at the Third National Conference highlighting the Transjordan's political and economic status and warned attendees of British policies in support of Zionism in Palestine which, according to him, aimed to turn it into a Jewish homeland that neglected the rights of the Arab natives. The conference concluded with demanding an elected legislature that holds the Emir's government accountable.

=== As civil servant ===
In 1928, Tal was preparing to publish his own newspaper under the name of Al-Anba' (The News). He wrote most of its articles before he was banned from publishing them. Later he was appointed as Administrative Governor of Shoubak for the second time. In 1931, Tal was exiled to Aqaba for four months because of an article he published in Al-Karmil. He befriended an Afghan sheikh there, where Tal would often drink alcohol and the sheikh tea together. Tal was released after he wrote a poem apologizing to Prime Minister Abd Allah Siraj.

In 1931, Tal worked as a teacher in his hometown of Irbid. During this time, Tal enjoyed a good relationship with Emir Abdullah despite their previous altercations. He accompanied him on several visits to the Badia (desert). Tal turned from working in the Ministry of Education to the judiciary after having succeeded in a legal examination at the end of 1929. He worked as the Chief Clerk of the Irbid Court of First Instance, then the Commander of the Amman Procedure Court, Chief Clerk of the Court of Appeal (1935) and finally as the Public Prosecutor of Al-Salt and its Deputy Attorney General. During the latter position, he filed a case against Transjordan's Prime Minister Ibrahim Hashem who had exiled him to Jeddah in 1923. The Court found that there was no reason to expel Tal from his job and that the charge pressed did not amount worthy of exile.

Tal then became Inspector General in the Ministry of Education and then Chief of Protocol at the Emir's Court. He remained as Chief of Protocol for five months before being laid off in 1942 and jailed at the Mahatta Prison for 70 days because of an altercation with then Prime Minister Tawfik Abu Al-Huda.

=== Death ===
After his release from prison he worked as a lawyer. His alcoholism worsened and he began feeling overwhelmingly bitter and desperate. "Disease, desperation and alcohol were all destroying him and shortening his life", according to Al-Oudat. On 25 May 1949, a day before his 50th birthday, Al-Oudate wrote that "in the Amman Public Hospital, the hand of death was hard on Arar and it stabbed his beating heart. Before he grasped his last breath, he said in an innocent Irbidi accent 'ugh if I can get better and say what is in my heart... Ugh ugh if I can say an ugh that is satisfactory.'"

== Works ==
=== 'Ashiyyat Wadi Al-Yabis ===
Tal died in 1949 without publishing any collections of his poems, which he used to sign using the pseudonym Arar, a reference to the son of Amro bin Sha, a figure in Arab and Islamic history. Tal gathered his poems in 1933 and named his Diwan, poem collection, Ashiyyat Wadi Al-Yabis (The Nights of Al-Yabis Valley). The title of his poem collection was reminiscent of the times he spent with the Dom community. But Tal's friends disagree with this interpretation and insist that Ashiyyat was the name of a gypsy woman he loved rather than referring to "nights".

Tal's friend Mahmoud Motlaq published Ashiyyat Wadi Al-Yabis in 1954, which included 66 poems that Tal's son Maryoud collected from newspapers and drafts. Moutlaq excluded 20 verses from publishing because he considered them to be "bad". When Tal's other friend Yacoub Al-Oudat published his biography titled Arar: Jordan's poet in 1958, it included more than 500 verses which were not present in Moutlaq's first edition of Ashiyyat Wadi Al-Yabis. But Al-Oudat admitted that he left out a couple of verses that included profanity because he said that poets shouldn't be remembered for a couple of inappropriate verses that they wrote in a fist of fury. In 1973, professor Mahmoud Al-Samra published the second edition of Ashiyyat Wadi Al-Yabis in which he included 33 verses that weren't published in the first edition. In 1982, academic Ziad Zou'bi found tens of verses in both editions of Ashiyyat Wadi Al-Yabis and Arar: Jordan's poet that were not written by Tal but by other poets. In his edition, he removed them from the main part, attributed them to the original writer and added them in an annex. Zou'bi published three more editions in 1988, 2007 and 2017.

Many of Tal's poem venerate Jordan. He was the first Jordanian poet to include geographical references in his poetry. In this poem, he was talking with a preacher named Sheikh Aboud:

يقول عبود جنات النعيم على أبوابها حارس يدعوه رضوانا
من ماء راحوب لم يشرب وليس له ربع بجلعاد أو حي بشيحانا
ولا تفيأ في عجلون وارفة ولا حدا بهضاب السلط قطعانا
ولا أصاخ الى أطيارنا سحرا بالغور تملأه شدوا وألحانا
ولا بوادي الشتا تأمته جؤذرة ولا رعى بسهول الحصن غزلانا
ولا تأردنه بيوم محتمل ولا تقديسه الأردن إمكانا
إذا كانت يا شيخ هذا شأن جنتكم فابعد بها انها ليست بمرمانا
وقل معي بلسان غير ذي عوج لا كنت يا جنة الفردوس مأوانا

Translation:

Aboud says that on the doors of heaven there is a guard named Ridwan
He hasn't drank from the waters of Rahub nor does he have friends in Gilead or a neighborhood in Shihan
He has not stood in the shade in Ajloun nor has he tended herds in the hills of Al-Salt
He has not listened to our magical birds in the Ghour singing hymns
Nor has he planted a tree in Wadi Al-Sheta or raised gazelles in the valleys of Al-Husn
There is no way he will ever become a Jordanian or will it ever be possible for him to glorify Jordan
Oh Sheikh if this is your heaven then keep it away from us as it isn't within our reach
And say with me without rolling your tongue that heaven shall never be our sanctuary

Tal also wrote poems criticizing the British colonial officials in Jordan including Frederick Peake and Glubb Pasha, Transjordan's Arab Legion commanders, and Lieutenant Colonel Henry Cox, the British Representative. In addition to Tal, Emir Abdullah was also a poet and the two men were one of the leading poets of their day, responsible for formulating alternate visions of the country through their poetry.

Many of Tal's poems were about women and alcohol:

سأفتح حانةً وأبيع خمراً بوادي السير لكن للعذارى
لعل عيونك السوداء يوماً تطالعني بحملقة السكارى

Translation:

I will open a bar and sell alcohol in Wadi Al-Seer but for virgins
Perhaps one day your dark eyes will look at me with a drunkard stare

=== Talal ===
I am a joyful man and in my joyful life I follow Plato's method, Epicurus' doctrine, Khayyam's spirit and Diogenes' path. I have my own philosophy which mixes all of these four philosophical schools.

— Tal describing his philosophical views in an interview with Palestinian radio during the late 1930s.

Tal wrote a manuscript titled Talal and gifted it to Emir Abdullah's son, Crown Prince Talal. Tal was also Talal's secretary for a short period during the mid-1930s and the two are thought to have enjoyed a close relationship.

=== Translation of Rubayat of Omar Khayyam ===
He returned to Khayyam's writings in 1926 but then as a critic and translator. Tal disagreed with Lebanese writer Amine Nakhlé's translations of the Khayyam, using his knowledge of Persian and Sufism. Nakhleh discontinued translating it and Tal replaced him publishing it in Beirut-based Minerva magazine.

=== Political papers and letters ===
Mohammad Ka'oush published Awraq Arar al-Syasya: Wathaeq Mustafa Wahbi Tal (Arar's Political Papers: Documents of Mustafa Wahbi Tal) in 1980, a collection of 33 articles written by Tal in Al-Karmil, which he used to sign his with the pseudonym "Monaser" and at other times "Ibn Jala".

Tal wrote essays about the political scene in Transjordan and Palestine. He corresponded with several influential figures including: Sharif Hussein bin Ali, Emir Abdullah, Jordanian activist Suleiman Nabulsi, Palestinian leader Haj Amin Al-Husseini, Egyptian Prime Minister Mostafa El-Nahas, American British historian Bernard Lewis and to several newspaper editors in Egypt, Syria and Palestine.

Tal's other writings were published in three book by Zeyad Zou'bi: Ala Hamesh Ashiyyat (On the sidelines of Ashiyyat, 2001), Maqalat Wa Nosous Thaqafieh (Articles and Cultural Writings, 2002), and Arar Wa Khayyam (Arar and Khayyam, 2003).

== Legacy ==
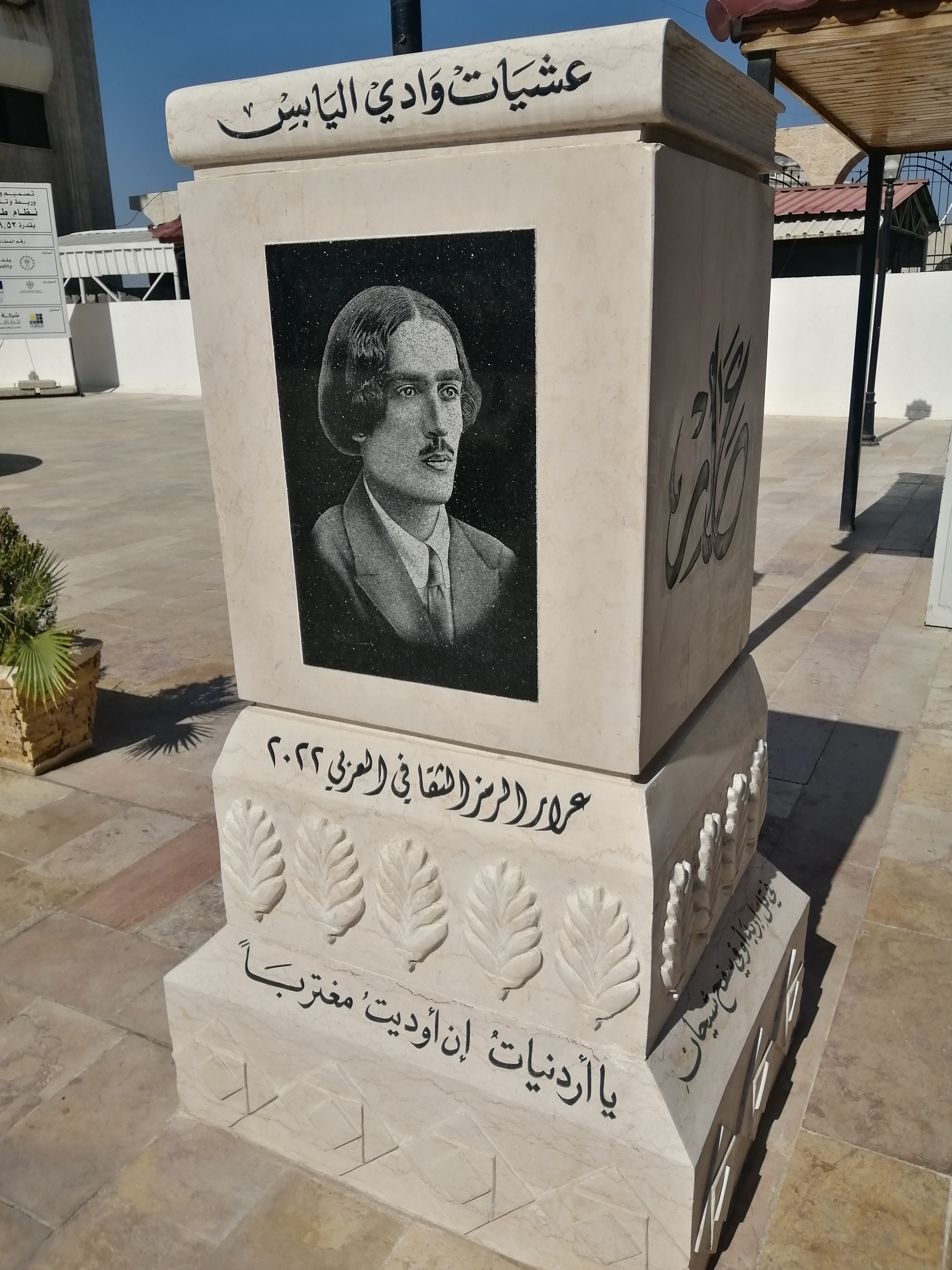
Monument to Mustafa Wahbi Tal in Irbid, Jordan

Mustafa Wahbi Tal is considered to be one of Jordan's most prominent poets and one of the most well-known Jordanian poets among Arab readers. The Yarmouk University in his hometown of Irbid named Jordan's most prestigious literary award after him, the Arar Prize for Literary Creativity. Irbid holds an annual poetry festival named after him. The Arar Literary Forum holds cultural events in Tal's house in Irbid, which was turned into a museum that welcomes hundreds of visitors annually.

== Personal life ==
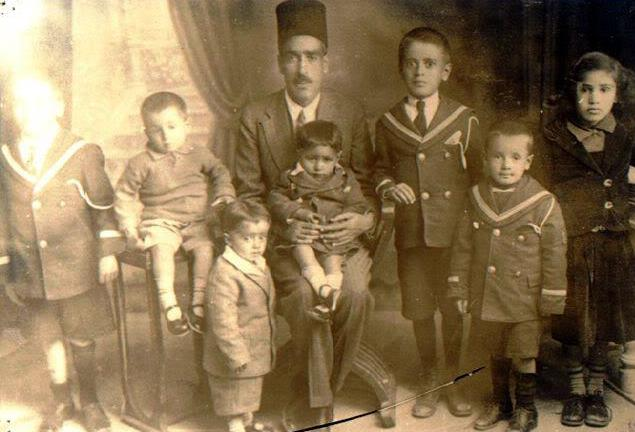
Mustafa Wahbi Tal with his children, early 1930s

Tal was married four times and had ten children. His first marriage was to Munifa Baban, a Kurdish woman he met during his time in Arapgir, Turkey. They were married on 25 November 1918. When Tal left his job in Arapgir and returned to his hometown of Irbid, he left his wife at his uncle's house. His first son Wasfi was born there. Wasfi later relocated with his mother to live at his father's house in Irbid when he was four years old. The couple would later have five more children: Mou'een, Maryoud, Sa'eed, Shaker and Abdallah.

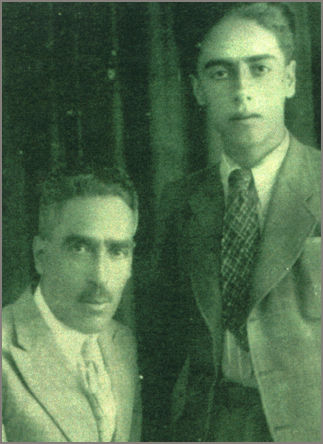
Mustafa Wahbi Tal and his son Wasfi Tal during the late 1930s. Wasfi would later become the Prime Minister of Jordan

Tal also married Shoma Harb Al-Dahiyat in 1925. The day after their marriage he left to a faraway village to arbitrate a tribal dispute and sent her divorce papers from there. He was married again to Oufa' Al-Jabr, a Bedouin woman, in 1933 and the couple had four children: Safieh, Sayel, Alieh and Taha. He married Adwieh 'Araj, a Circassian woman, in 1943 and was divorced shortly after.

When Tal was jailed and expelled from his job as Chief of Protocol in the Emir's Court in 1942 because of an altercation with then Prime Minister Tawfik Abu Al-Huda, his eldest son Wasfi was outraged and sought an interview with the Prime Minister who refused to see him. Wasfi lost his temper in the corridor outside the Prime Minister's office and launched into a tirade of abuse and curses which were overheard by Abu Al-Huda. He was jailed with his father for three months and lost his job as a chemistry teacher. Wasfi later became Jordan's Prime Minister for several tenures during the late 1960s and early 1970s until his assassination in 1971. Mustafa's other son Sa'eed would later become Deputy Prime Minister of Jordan during the 1990s.
