= 1977 in Jordan =

- Decades: 1950s; 1960s; 1970s; 1980s; 1990s
- See also: Other events of 1977; Timeline of Jordanian history

Events from the year 1977 in Jordan.

== Incumbents ==
- Monarch: Hussein
- Prime Minister: Mudar Badran

== Deaths ==
- 9 February - Alia al-Hussein

== See also ==
- Years in Iraq
- Years in Syria
- Years in Saudi Arabia
