= 1978 in Jordan =

- Decades: 1950s; 1960s; 1970s; 1980s; 1990s
- See also: Other events of 1978; Timeline of Jordanian history

Events from the year 1978 in Jordan.

== Incumbents ==
- Monarch: Hussein
- Prime Minister: Mudar Badran

== Births ==
- 28 June - Ayman Adais.

== Deaths ==
- El-Amiri.

== See also ==
- Years in Iraq
- Years in Syria
- Years in Saudi Arabia
