= Assassination of Wasfi Tal =

1971 murder in Cairo, Egypt

- Part of Arab Cold War and the aftermath of Black September
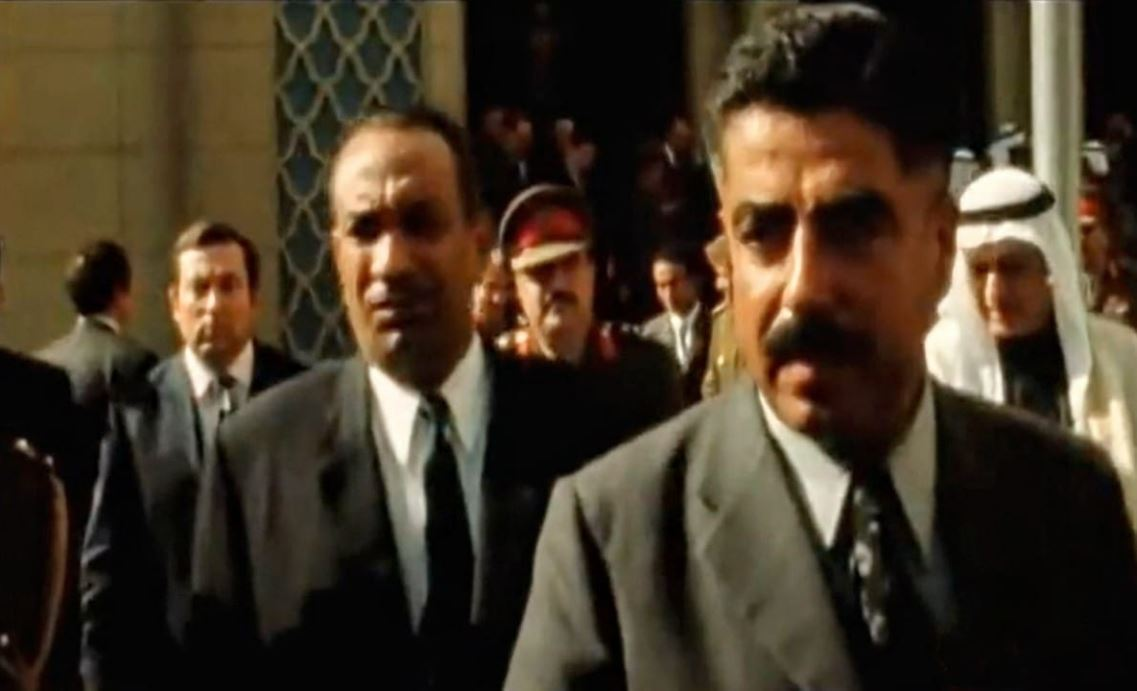
- Wasfi Tal (right) shortly before his assassination in Cairo, Egypt, on 28 November 1971
- Location: 30°2′19.97″N 31°13′11.75″E; Sheraton Hotel, Cairo, Egypt
- Date: 28 November 1971; 54 years ago c. 3:45 p.m. (UTC+2)
- Target: Wasfi Tal
- Attack type: Political assassination; shooting
- Weapon: Handgun
- Deaths: Wasfi Tal
- Injuries: Jordanian Foreign Minister Abdullah Salah
- Perpetrators: Black September Organization: Izzat Rabah; Jawad Abu Aziza Al-Baghdadi; Mundhir Khalifa; Ziad Al-Helou; All of them planned with Fakhri Al Omari
- Motive: In response for the Black September conflict

On 28 November 1971, Wasfi Tal, the 15th Prime Minister of Jordan, was assassinated while he was on his way to attend an Arab League meeting at the Sheraton Hotel in Cairo, Egypt. Tal was shot at close range by a member of the Black September Organization, which was said to be responding to the 1970 Black September conflict.

Egyptian security forces apprehended four individuals and launched an investigation in the wake of the attack. A few days after the operation, the accused appeared elated in an Egyptian court, and were eventually released without prosecution.

== Background ==
After the assassination of Jordanian Prime Minister Hazza' Majali in 1960, an audio recording of Wasfi Tal emerged, in which he predicted his own death. He said:

The battle is against nonsense and forgery, and the battle cannot afford mistakes. There must be casualties in the battle. As for Jordan specifically, one of its victims was Hazza' Majali, and I might be a victim, and someone else might become a victim; this is a battle. If we are right, it is our duty to make this sacrifice. The conspiracy that killed Hazza' Majali did not weaken us, and the one that will kill me will not weaken us. The list will continue; if a master dies, another master will rise. There is inevitability for goodness, truth, and integrity.

=== Premiership ===
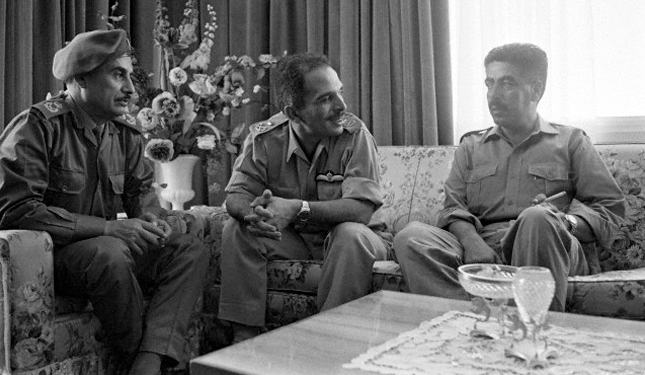
Jordanian King meets advisors on events of Black September, 17 September 1970. Prime minister Wasfi Tal (right) and army chief of staff Habis Al-Majali (left)

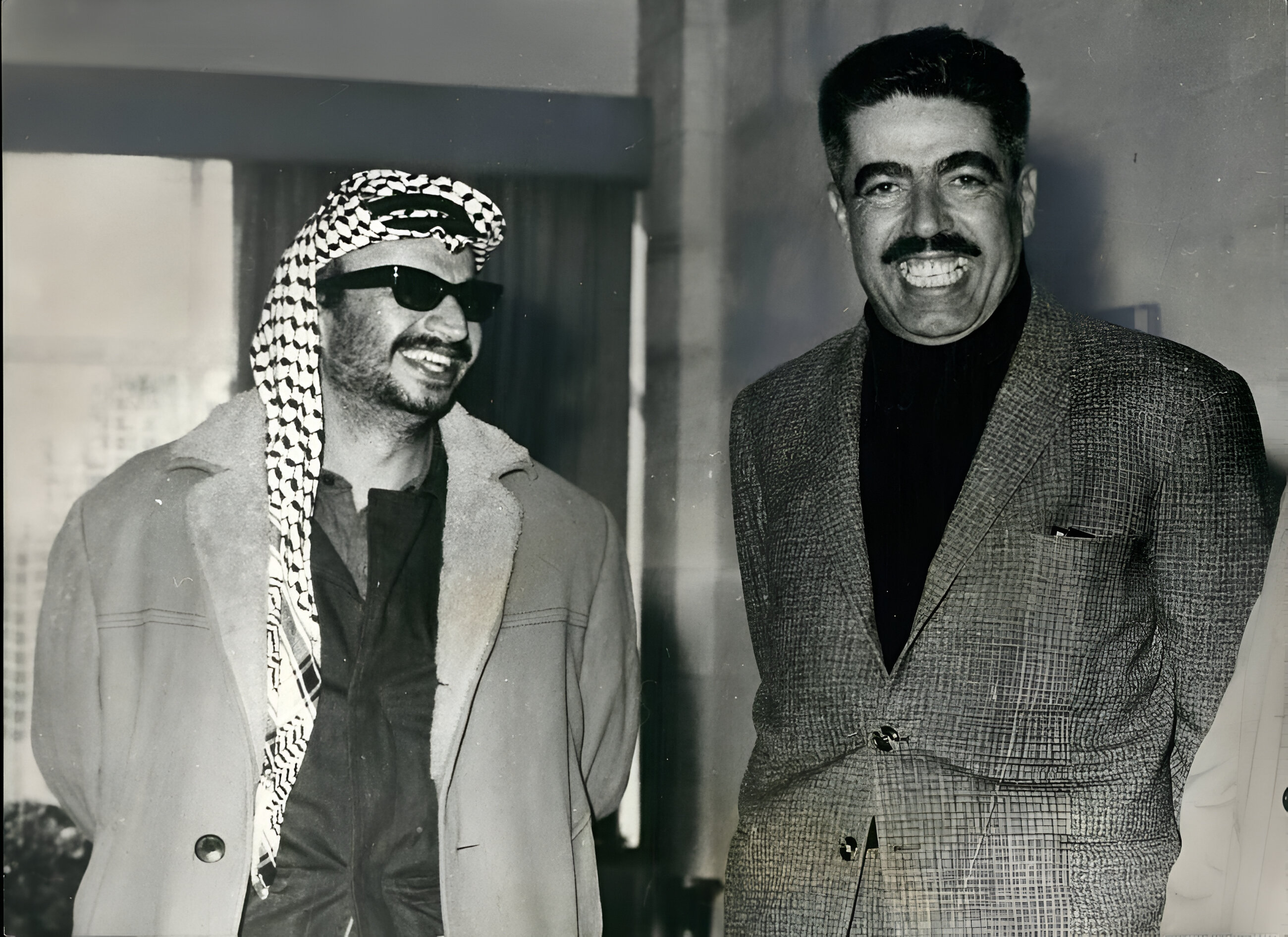
Wasfi Tal with PLO Chairman Yasser Arafat in December 1970 during the ceasefire negotiations

A conflict broke out between Jordan and Palestinian militant groups in the country in September 1970. Wasfi Tal was one of King Hussein's closest advisors during the conflict, and was subsequently appointed as Prime Minister later that year. Tal headed the operations that eventually saw the conflict's end in mid-1971 with the expulsion of the PLO from the country.

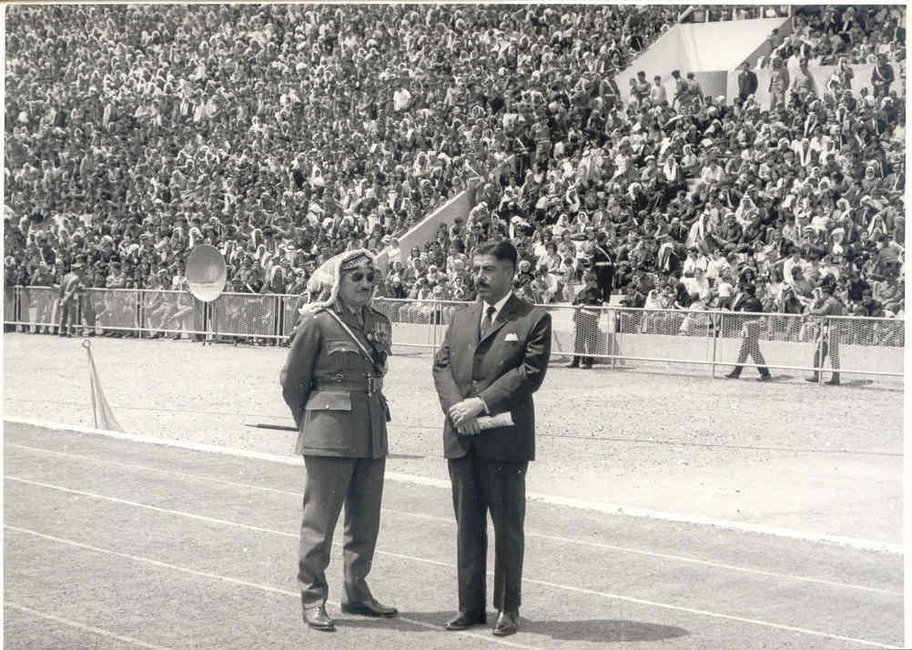
Premier Wasfi Tal with army chief Habis Majali at a stadium in Amman

=== Opinions of Arab politicians of Tal ===
An enmity had developed between Palestine Liberation Organization chairman Yasser Arafat and Tal after the latter's involvement in the killing of Abu Ali Iyad in the Ajloun forests. Tal opposed any organization operating in Jordan on behalf of another state, fearing that the activities of the fedayeen might turn against the Hashemite regime instead of focusing on the Israeli occupation. He also mentioned that, after the Battle of Karameh, the fedayeen did not carry out any operations for about 18 months, which angered them.

There was also an enmity between Egyptian President Anwar Sadat and Tal, stemming from the Yemen War of 1962. Sadat sought to have Tal killed, a sentiment later confirmed by his wife, Jehan Sadat, in an interview.

Syrian President Hafez al-Assad had despised King Hussein and his government, accusing them of collaborating with Israel during the 1967 war. Assad also supported the fedayeen during Black September and fought in the October War with Sadat, excluding Jordan.

Relations between Jordan and Libya were strained at the time, with no agreement between President Muammar Gaddafi and King Hussein. After Tal's assassination, Gaddafi threatened to withdraw Libya from the Arab League if the killers of Tal were not released.

== Preparations ==
A week prior to the incident, Jordanian intelligence (GID) intercepted coded messages indicating an impending assassination of Wasfi Tal. Shortly thereafter, additional information about the plot emerged. The day before his departure, Natheer Rshaid, the then-director of Jordanian intelligence, made a personal effort to warn Tal and urged him not to proceed with the trip. He told him: "The Nasserist regime is planning to assassinate you". However, Tal chose to ignore the warning and insisted on going ahead, replying: "No one dies before their time, and lives are in the hands of God".

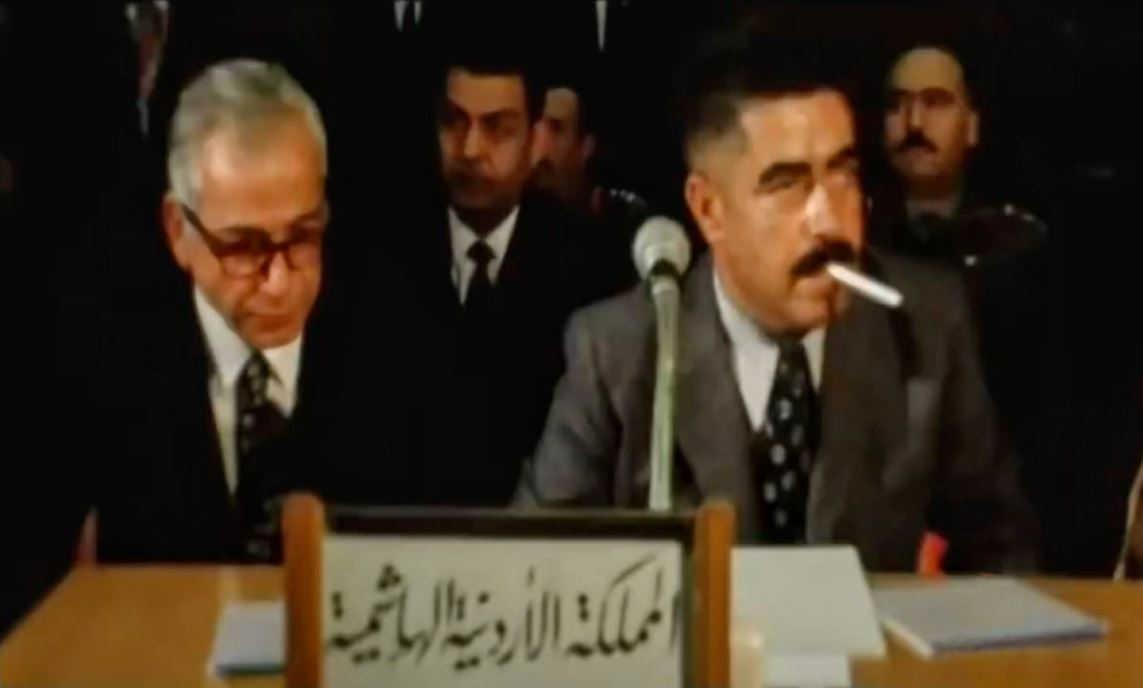
Wasfi Tal, pictured with Abdullah Salah on the left, at the Arab League meeting in Cairo, approximately thirty minutes before his assassination

On 28 November 1971, Wasfi Tal traveled from Jordan to Egypt to attend the Arab Summit, joined by Foreign Minister Abdullah Salah and Jordanian Ambassador to Egypt Ali al-Hayari. There were concerns about several actions taken by the Egyptian government that suggested opposition to Tal. For instance, upon the arrival of the plane at Cairo International Airport, there was no security detail present to welcome Tal. This oversight puzzled Fayez al-Louzi, Tal's military aide, as it appeared that the Egyptian government had not even sent vehicles to transport him. Consequently, Ambassador Ali al-Hiyari arranged for a car from a local Egyptian car rental service.

The Egyptian authorities permitted the perpetrators to carry their weapons into the airport, citing their affiliation with the Palestine Liberation Organization and asserting the right to carry arms and move freely. Members of the Palestine Liberation Organization entered the airport using forged Syrian, Lebanese, and Sudanese passports under assumed identities, which went unnoticed by airport security.

During the meeting, Tal presented a detailed report to the Arab defense ministers, focusing on strategies for confronting Israel in 1971. Central to his address was a call for the establishment of a "fourth front," which he defined as a popular uprising within Palestine. He emphasized the need for Arab nations to unite in supporting this initiative, urging the ministers to ensure the provision of financial resources, media coverage, and logistical backing for Palestinian forces. He framed this effort as the "revolution of the occupied territories," underlining its importance in the broader struggle for Palestinian self-determination. After the meeting adjourned, Tal departed with his guard, Foreign Minister Abdullah Salah, and Ambassador Ali al-Hayari, heading to the Sheraton Hotel.

== Assassination ==
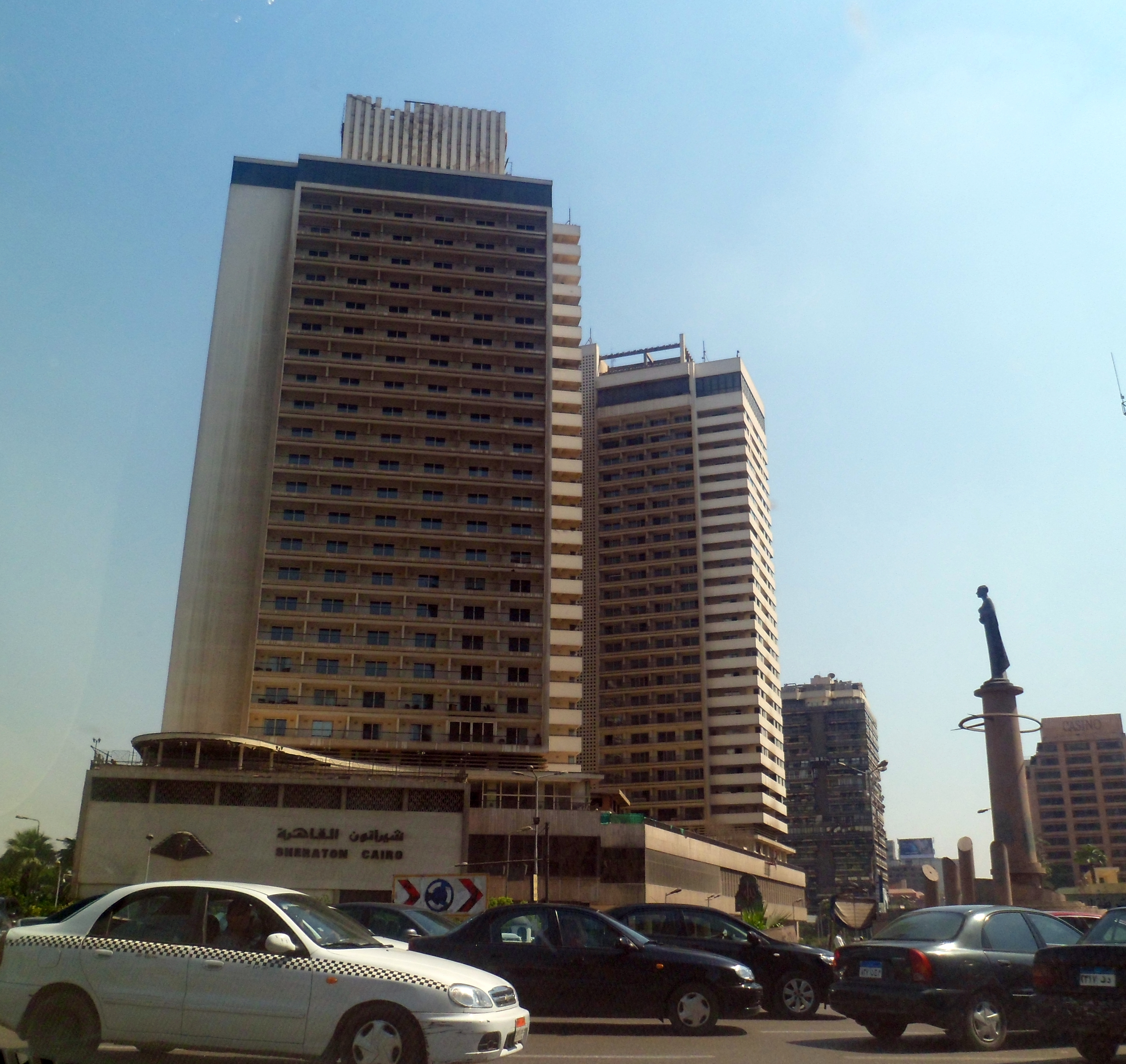
Sheraton Hotel Cairo lobby (where Wasfi al-Tal was assassinated)

Shortly after Wasfi Tal and Abdullah Salah stepped out of the car near the Sheraton hotel entrance, gunfire erupted at 3:45 pm Cairo time. Tal was shot by a Palestinian gunman and collapsed to the ground. A total of 14 bullets were fired, three of which hit Tal. The gunman approached Tal and shot him at close range. One of the assassins said to him as he lay dying, "Abu Ali Iyad didn't die, and Palestinians are not cowards". Following this, Ezzat Rabah approached Tal and emptied his pistol into his body. Ziad Al-Helou, stationed outside the hotel, fired additional shots. As Tal lay dying, Mundhir Khalifa knelt and lapped with his tongue the blood flowing across the marble floor, as he said at the trial, "I'm the one who drank his blood." During the attack, many of Tal's guards and the Arab ministers present sought shelter in the chaos.

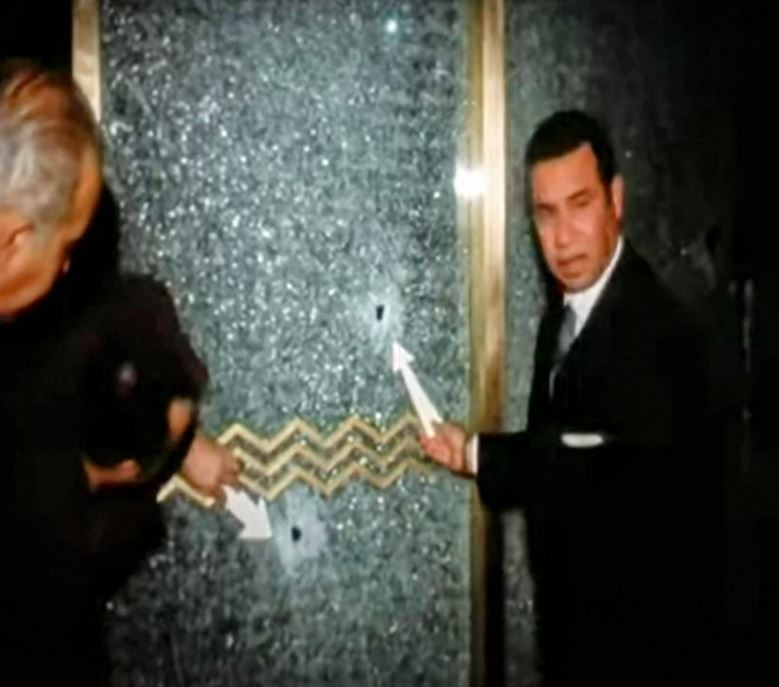
Bullet holes where the gunshots penetrated the glass of the foyer

The first bullet struck Tal's left hand, while the second pierced his left arm and traveled into his heart, causing fatal internal bleeding. Foreign Minister Abdullah Salah was also injured, sustaining a torn pant leg in the attack. A doctor from the hotel confirmed Tal's death after approximately 12 minutes. His wife, Saadya Al-Jabri, was on the fourth floor of the hotel when she received the news of her husband's shooting. Overcome with grief and hysteria, she had to be attended to by the hotel's medical team. Tal's body was later transferred to a military hospital in Cairo.

Emergency responders arrived about 40 minutes after the incident, while Egyptian security forces and police showed up only 15 minutes later, despite the Dokki Police Station being located near the scene. This delay angered many Jordanians, who accused the Egyptian authorities of collusion and complicity in the assassination. Egyptian security forces eventually apprehended the perpetrators and launched an investigation. The Black September Organization claimed responsibility for the attack. Initial suspicions fell on Muhammad Youssef al-Najjar, but investigations later ruled out his involvement. Egyptian newspapers prominently reported that the primary suspect and mastermind of the operation was Fakhri Al-Omari, who had managed to evade capture.

At the time of Tal death, an unloaded Smith & Wesson gun was found in his right pocket. His other pockets contained 60 Egyptian pounds (Tal's daily allowance), a hookah, and a tobacco tin. Also found was a paper listing the names of individuals, including "Abu Ali," "Abu Hassan," and a man from the Zahran family, who was found to be managing a farm. Next to each name was an amount of money, with the largest amount listed being 11 dinars. It was later revealed that this was a debt list, showing that Tal owed some farmers who had brought fertilizer for his farm in Mafraq. The titles of "Abu Ali" and "Abu Hassan" referred to poor individuals to whom Tal sent financial aid from his monthly salary.

== Immediate aftermath ==
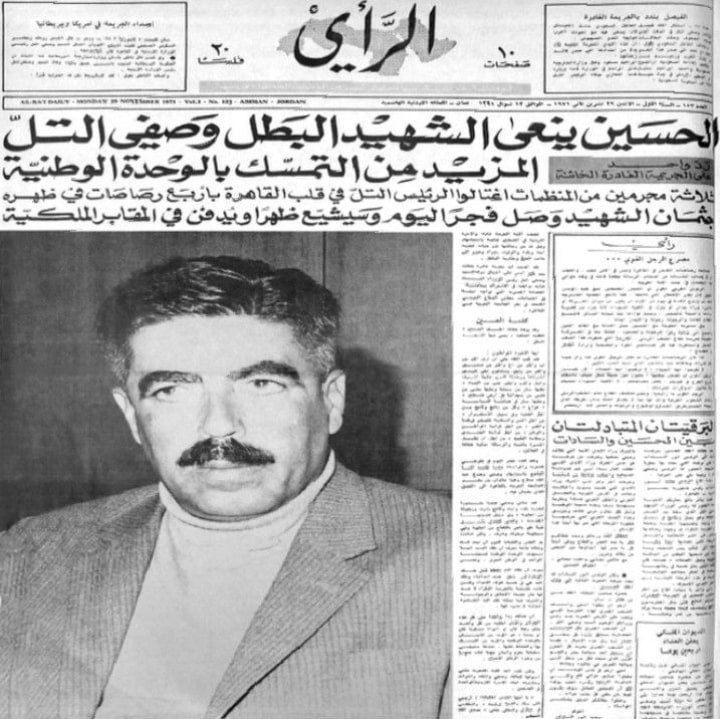
Al-Ra'i newspaper announces the news of the assassination of Wasfi Tal

The assassination of Wasfi Tal shocked both the Jordanian public and the broader Arab world. King Hussein, deeply affected by the loss of his close advisor and friend, declared a national period of mourning. The assassination was also seen as a turning point in the relationship between the Jordanian monarchy and Palestinian factions, as it further deepened the divide between the two groups. The New York Times described the incident that day:

.. this cowardly murder in a Cairo hotel can hardly aid the cause of the Palestinian Arabs, which the assassins profess to champion. It is another sordid example of the tendency of some Palestinians toward self‐destruction and of the persisting capacity for mischief of the extremist elements whose organized military strength in Jordan was so effectively decimated under Mr. Tal's...

In the immediate aftermath of the assassination, the Jordanian government launched an investigation into the attack. The assassin was quickly identified as a member of the Palestinian Black September group, and Jordanian authorities worked closely with Egyptian officials to apprehend those responsible for orchestrating the murder.

Fakhri Al-Omari remained wanted by the Jordanian judicial system until his death in 1991. Meanwhile, the Egyptian authorities released the perpetrators of the assassination without punishment or trial, a move widely seen as evidence of Nasserist regime complicity. More significantly, some claim that Egyptian officials allowed the assassins to bring their weapons into the country upon their arrival by plane, further implicating them in the operation.

The assassination also marked a significant turning point in Jordanian-Palestinian relations. While King Hussein vowed to continue his policy of stability and national unity, the killing of Tal further strained the already fragile relationship between the Jordanian government and Palestinian factions. It also prompted Jordan to adopt a more hardline stance in dealing with Palestinian militant groups.

After the death of Wasfi Tal, the Jordanian Royal Court declared a period of mourning for forty days. School attendance was suspended for three days, and some university professors refrained from giving lectures. Some university students, including those from the University of Jordan, engaged in riots and prevented professors from conducting lectures. Every year, Jordanian university students commemorate his assassination and chant in his honor. The "New Wasfiyun" and "Sons of the Farmers" movements were formed in the universities.

=== Funeral ===
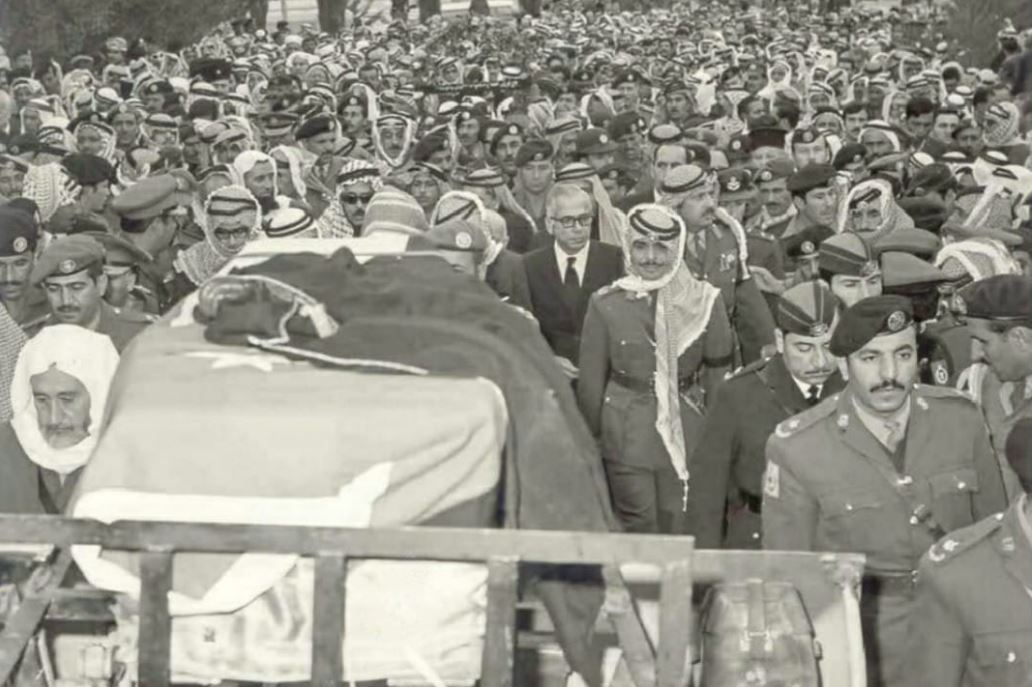
King Hussein seen leading the funeral of Tal, who was surrounded by his brothers, 29 November 1971

Wasfi Tal's body was transferred from the military hospital in Cairo, after an autopsy was performed, to the airport. From there, it was flown by a special military aircraft to Amman on the night of 28 November 1971. King Hussein bin Talal, who mourned him deeply, was there to receive the body and offered condolences to the Jordanian people. During the funeral, many prominent Jordanians, including King Hussein, were seen crying. He was buried in the Royal Cemetery after the Royal Mosque prayer in Amman on November 29.

== Trial ==
Following Tal's assassination, the Jordanian government dispatched the deputy director of Intelligence to observe the investigations for eight days; however, he was denied access to any information related to the case.

A few days after the operation, the accused appeared in the High Court of Justice. Media noted their smiles, elegant suits and colorful ties, and that they raised their hands in a victory salute. The event was also attended by lawyers from Algeria, Egypt, Libya, Syria, and Palestine, who sought to analyze the Jordanian government's treatment of Palestinians, rather than the criminal culpability of the accused individuals.

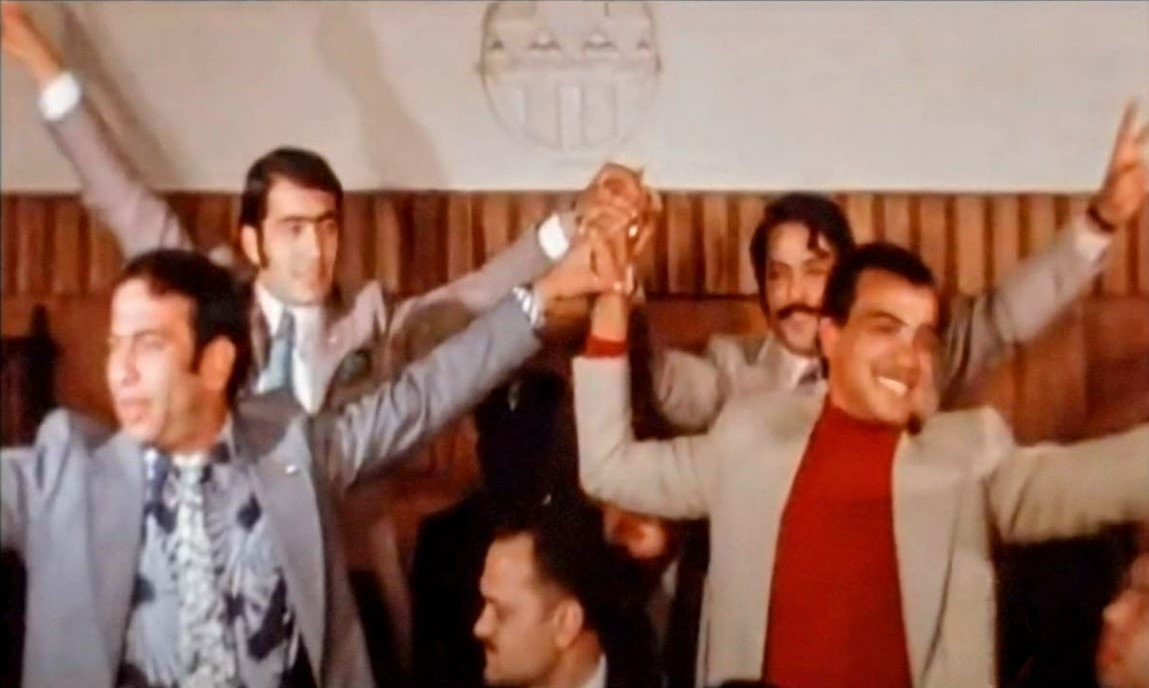
The men accused of killing Wasfi Tal (Izzat Rabah, Jawad Abu Aziza Al-Baghdadi, Mundhir Khalifa, and Ziad Al-Helou) at the High Court in Egypt on 19 February 1972

Palestinian lawyer Ahmad Shukeiri said, "Let us prosecute Jordan from this court." He added, "These four are Ashmawi, and in Egypt, you call the killer of a killer Ashmawi. These four are the Ashmawi of the Arab nation". This statement changed the course of the investigation, and the High Court of Justice requested that the files of Black September be included. As a result, the case took on a new political direction. In their view, the assassination of Wasfi Tal was an act of vengeance for the massacres that occurred during Black September. Thus, the case of Wasfi Tal shifted from a criminal case to a political one.

Many Arab authorities defended the accused killers, including Egyptian President Anwar Sadat and Syrian President Hafez al-Assad. Sadat's wife, Gehan, said in a statement to a visiting delegation that the young men had only done what Anwar Sadat had wanted to do himself. Libya wanted the release of the four men and threatened to withdraw from the Arab League.

On 19 February 1972, the judges entered the sentencing session, the accused shouted, "Long live free, Arab Palestine!" At that point, the trial turned into a political rally. The judge sat down and said, "After reviewing the documents, hearing the arguments, and deliberating legally, and in accordance with Articles 145 and 146 of the Code of Criminal Procedure, the court has decided to release the accused".

== Legacy ==
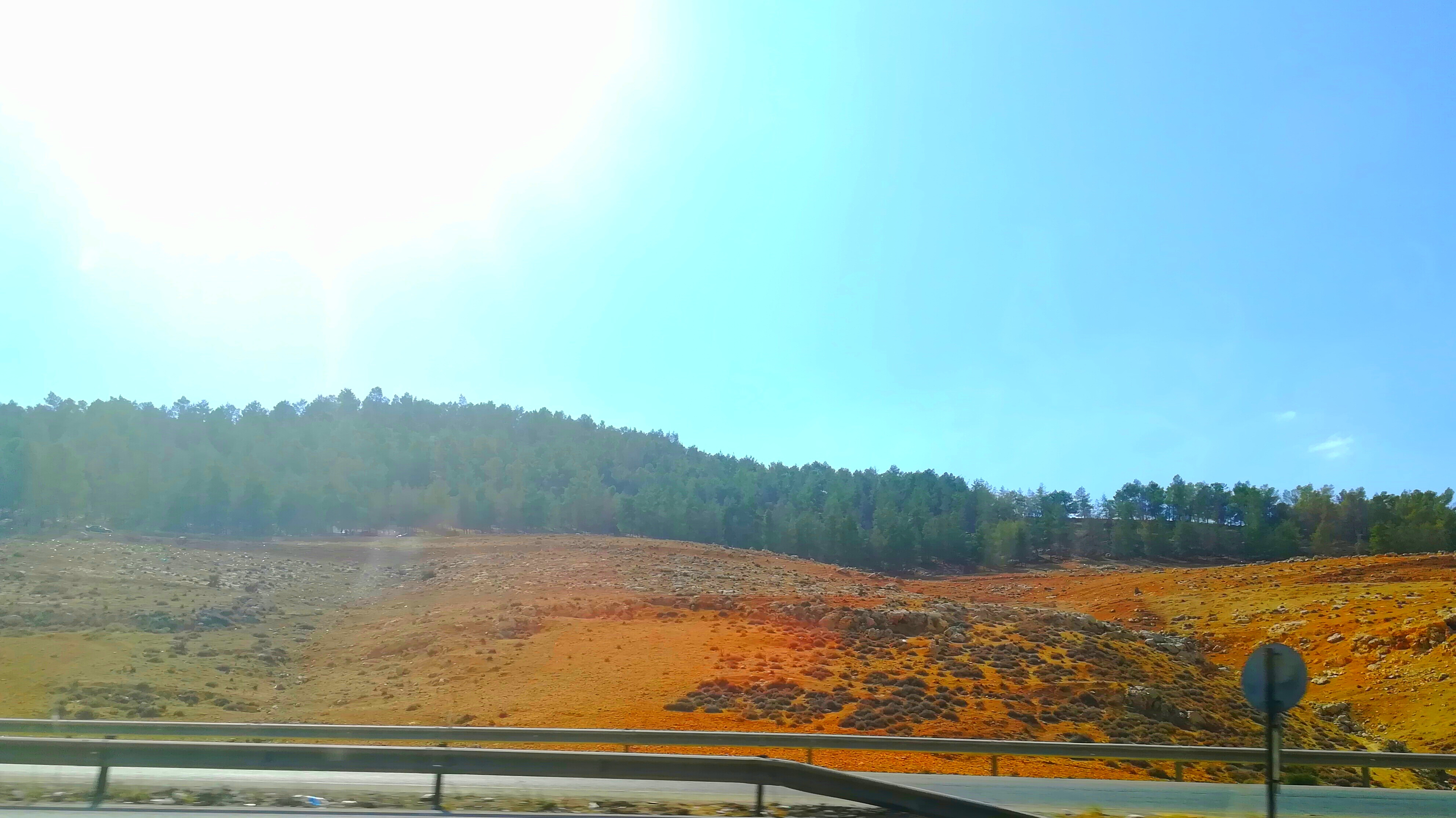
Martyr Wasfi Tal Forest on the Irbid-Jerash Road (Highway 35), established in 1972 by the Ministry of Agriculture

Wasfi Tal remains a figure of importance in Jordan's modern history. While his legacy is complicated by his role in the Black September conflict and his association with the Jordanian monarchy, he is remembered by many as a capable and dedicated leader who worked tirelessly for the welfare of his country. His assassination turned him into a political martyr in the eyes of most Jordanians, particularly those who viewed him as a protector of Jordanian sovereignty and stability.

To honor his contributions, several landmarks bear his name, including a forest and an amphitheater at the University of Jordan's Faculty of Science, and Jadara University. Numerous streets and squares across Jordan also commemorate him. Al-Tal inspired many Jordanian poets, who composed elegies mourning his loss and celebrating his values. Prominent singers like Abdo Mousa and Omar Al-Abdallat performed songs in his honor.

== See also ==
- Death and state funeral of Hussein of Jordan

== Sources ==
- Shlaim, Avi (2008). Lion of Jordan: The Life of King Hussein in War and Peace. Vintage Books. ISBN 978-1-4000-7828-8.
