= Fadi Shaheen =

Jordanian footballer

Personal information
- Full name: Fadi Fares Nemer Shaheen
- Date of birth: 21 June 1979 (age 47)
- Place of birth: Amman, Jordan
- Position: Right back

Team information
- Current team: Al-Baqa'a
- Number: 3

Senior career*
| Years | Team | Apps | (Gls) |
| 1998–2011 | Al-Wehdat | | |
| 2011–2013 | Al-Baqa'a | | |
| 2013–2014 | That Ras | | |
| 2014–2015 | Mansheyat Bani Hasan | | |
| 2015– | Al-Baqa'a | | |
- * Club domestic league appearances and goals

Fadi Shaheen (born 21 June 1979) is a Jordanian football player of Palestinian origin, who plays as a right back for That Ras.
