= VAPCO =

Company based in Amman, Jordan

- Company type: Private Limited company
- Industry: Pharmaceutical
- Founded: 1975
- Headquarters: Amman, Jordan (Headquarters)
- Area served: Worldwide
- Products: veterinary and agrochemical products
- Number of employees: 340
- Website: http://www.vapco.net/

VAPCO Manufacturing CO. Ltd. is a company based in Amman, Jordan, that produces veterinary and agrochemical products. It was established in 1975.
