= Wasfi Tal =

Prime Minister of Jordan in 1962–63, 1965–67 and 1970–71

- وصفي التل
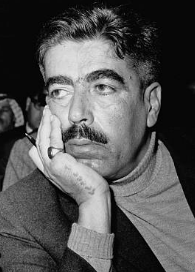
- Tal in 1962

15th Prime Minister of Jordan
- In office 28 October 1970 – 28 November 1971
- Monarch: Hussein
- Preceded by: Ahmad Toukan
- Succeeded by: Ahmad Lozi
- In office 14 February 1965 – 4 March 1967
- Monarch: Hussein
- Preceded by: Bahjat Talhouni
- Succeeded by: Hussein ibn Nasser
- In office 28 January 1962 – 27 March 1963
- Monarch: Hussein
- Preceded by: Bahjat Talhouni
- Succeeded by: Samir Al-Rifai

Personal details
- Born: 1920 Arapgir, Ottoman Empire
- Died: November 28, 1971 (aged 50–51) Cairo, Egypt
- Spouse: Saida Al Jabari
- Education: American University of Beirut
- Occupation: Military officer, diplomat

Military service
- Allegiance: British Empire; Mandatory Palestine; Syrian Republic; Jordan
- Branch/service: British Army; Arab Liberation Army; Syrian Army; Royal Jordanian Army
- Years of service: 1940s–1971
- Rank: Captain (ALA); Major (Syria)
- Battles/wars: Second World War; 1948 Arab-Israeli War; Black September

Wasfi Tal (Arabic: وصفي التل; also known as Wasfi Tell; 1920 – 28 November 1971) was a Jordanian politician, statesman and military officer. He served as the 15th Prime Minister of Jordan for three separate terms, 1962–63, 1965–67 and 1970 until his assassination in 1971.

Tal was born in Arapgir, Ottoman Empire to prominent Jordanian poet Mustafa Wahbi Tal and a Kurdish mother. He received his elementary education in Jordan, later continuing his education at the American University of Beirut in Lebanon. He then joined the British Army in Mandatory Palestine after being trained in a British-run military academy, and joined the irregular Arab Liberation Army to fight against Israel during the 1948 Arab–Israeli War. As an Arab nationalist, Tal was known for his belief in collective Arab action and supported the Palestinian struggle.

Following the war, he served various positions in the Jordanian government, rising to higher positions after his abilities captured King Hussein's attention. His first tenure as prime minister in 1962 was short-lived, he resigned in 1963 over widespread criticism of his perceived pro-Western views. He was appointed prime minister again in 1965, which saw an improved climate of economic activity, but resigned just before the onset of the Six Day War in 1967. He was appointed again as prime minister in 1970 during Black September, the conflict which saw Palestine Liberation Organization fighters (fedayeen) expelled from Jordan. Earning the ire of PLO leaders for his role in the conflict, he was assassinated by the Black September Organization outside a Cairo hotel hosting an Arab League conference.

Tal was reportedly loyal to King Hussein and popular with Jordanians for his success in expelling the fedayeen. Meanwhile, he was widely denounced by Arabs who had supported the fedayeen. His assassins were found innocent and released on low bail by an Egyptian court and allowed to leave Egypt.

== Early life ==
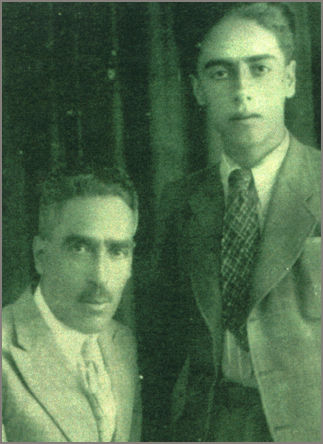
Wasfi Tal (right) with his father Mustafa Wahbi Tal during mid 1930s. His father is often described as Jordan's most prominent poet.

Tal was born in Arapgir, Turkey to prominent Jordanian poet Mustafa Wahbi Tal and Kurdish mother Munifa Baban. Sources differ with reference to the place and date of birth of Wasfi Tal. Some sources mention that he was born in 1919 in Arapqir. Other sources mention that Tal was born in 1920 He moved to Irbid, Transjordan with his mother at the age of five.

Tal obtained his elementary education in Jordan. He moved to Al-Salt in 1936 when he was 16 to go to the only public high school in Jordan at the time. As a student he founded a secret student organization called the "Black Hand" whose goal was to promote a more aggressive stance against Zionism. During his time as a student he and several students in the "black hand" were arrested after bombing Al-Salt mayor's mansion. Due to his family influence and the fact no one was hurt in the bombing he was released a few days later and allowed to finish his education. He later continued his education at the American University of Beirut in Lebanon where he studied philosophy and sciences.

== Career ==
Tal was a teacher in Karak. He joined the British Army in Mandatory Palestine after being trained in a British-run military academy, and joined the irregular Arab Liberation Army to fight against Israel during the 1948 Arab–Israeli War. Due to his experience in the British army, he started off with the rank of captain. After the Arab Liberation Army was dissolved in 1948, his unit was reassigned to the Syrian Army for the remainder of the war under the new name Yarmuk Forces. By May 1949, he had risen to the rank of major.

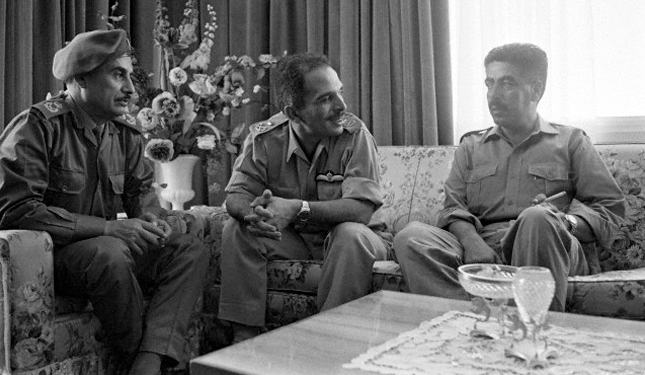
Jordanian King meets advisors on events of Black September, 17 September 1970

Following the war, he served various positions in the Jordanian government, rising to higher positions after his abilities captured King Hussein's attention. His first tenure as prime minister in 1962 was short-lived, he resigned in 1963 over widespread criticism of his perceived pro-Western views. He was appointed prime minister again in 1965, which saw an improved climate of economic activity, but resigned just before the onset of the Six Day War in 1967. He was appointed again as prime minister in 1970 during Black September, the conflict which saw Palestine Liberation Organization fighters (fedayeen) expelled from Jordan. Earning the ire of PLO leaders for his role in the conflict, he was assassinated by the Black September group outside a Cairo hotel hosting an Arab League conference. Tal was succeeded by Ahmad Lozi as prime minister immediately after the incident.

=== Tal's policies ===
As Prime Minister, Wasfi Tal prioritized the strengthening of Jordan’s economy and the enhancement of its military capabilities. He also worked towards improving relations with both Western and Arab nations. His foreign policy was characterized by a delicate balancing act between maintaining close ties with the United States and other Western powers while preserving Jordan’s position within the Arab world.

Tal's domestic policies were centered around economic development, infrastructure projects, and maintaining internal security. He recognized the importance of addressing the grievances of both Jordanians and Palestinians within the country, although tensions between these two groups remained high. After dismantling armed groups in Jordan and safeguarding the country's prestige and stability, Wasfi Tal's popularity surged, and he was widely regarded by Jordanians as a national hero. However, his role in the handling of Palestinian issues, particularly during the 1967 war and the Black September conflict, made him a controversial figure. While he was seen as a protector of Jordan’s sovereignty, many Palestinian groups and their supporters viewed him as a symbol of the monarchy's opposition to Palestinian rights. Because of Tal's actions towards the PLO, hostility arose between Tal and some Arab rulers and leaders.

It is recorded in the Jordanian Prime Ministry's biography of Tal that he was cautious with public funds and rejected corruption. He lived simply, forgoing privileges, and considered his office an uncompromising and serious obligation. One of his achievements was establishing the University of Jordan.

Tal was known for his belief in collective Arab action and supported the Palestinians' struggle for freedom of their homeland. The New York Times reported that "he was hated and feared most of all by the extremists because he was a rational man who sought a practical accommodation with Israel."

== Assassination ==
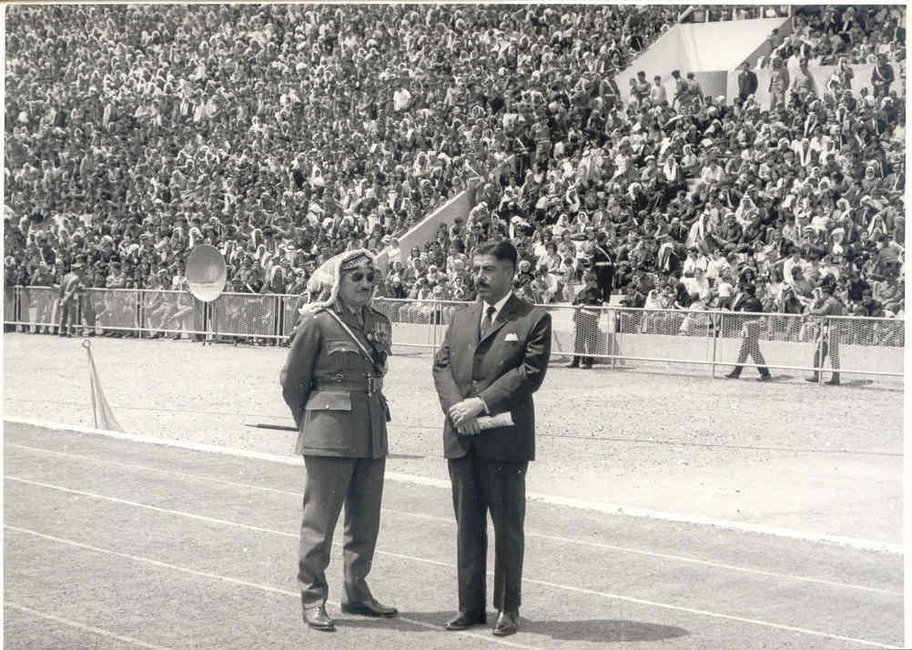
Field marshal Habis Majali and Wasfi Tal

On 28 November 1971, four Black September gunmen assassinated Tal in the lobby of the Sheraton Cairo Hotel in Egypt while he was attending an Arab League summit in the city. The shooting happened at 3:45 p.m. Cairo time. Gen. Muhammad Maher Hassan, the Egyptian prosecutor, said the assassins belonged to a group called "the Black Hand of September." Tal was 51 years old. Historian Patrick Seale writes that one of the assassins, Munshir al-Khalifa, was one of Abu Ali Iyad's soldiers who sought to avenge his commander's death. As Tal lay dying, "one of the assassins knelt and lapped with his tongue the blood flowing across the marble floor."

Tal was the first victim of the newly formed Black September Organization, a more militant offshoot of the Palestinian militant organization Fatah. Yasser Arafat, Fatah's leader, claimed responsibility for the killing.

Tal was popular with many native Jordanians for his success in expelling the fedayeen. Meanwhile, he was widely denounced by Arabs who had supported the fedayeen. Egyptian President Anwar Sadat had also despised Tal. Tal was the third senior Jordanian political figure assassinated between 1951 and 1971; the first two being King Abdullah I and Prime Minister Hazza Majali.

Tal's body was flown back to Amman on 28 November 1971. He was buried in the royal cemetery after the prayers in the Royal Mosque in Amman on 29 November.

There were reports of celebration among Palestinians on the Israeli-occupied West Bank of Jordan in response to news of Tal's assassination.

== Personal life ==
Tal was married to Sadia Jabri, who had been former wife of the Palestinian leader of the 1940s, Musa Alami. They had no children.

== Honour ==
=== Foreign honour ===
- Malaysia:
  - Honorary Grand Commander of the Order of the Defender of the Realm (SMN (K)) – Tun (1965)

== See also ==
- List of prime ministers of Jordan
- Palestinian political violence
- Mustafa Wahbi Tal
- Abdullah Tal

== Bibliography ==
- Amos, John (1980). Palestinian resistance: organization of a nationalist movement. Pergamon Press. ISBN 0-08-025094-7.
- Seale, Patrick (1992). Abu Nidal: a gun for hire. Random House. ISBN 0-679-40066-4.
- Susser, Asher (1994). On both banks of the Jordan : a political biography of Wasfi al-Tall. Frank Cass. ISBN 0714645281.

Political offices
| Preceded by Bahjat Talhouni | Prime Minister of Jordan; 1962–1963 | Succeeded by Samir al-Rifai |
| Preceded by Bahjat Talhouni | Prime Minister of Jordan; 1965–1967 | Succeeded by Hussein ibn Nasser |
| Preceded by Ahmad Toukan | Prime Minister of Jordan; 1970–1971 | Succeeded by Ahmad al-Lawzi |
