= Ahmad Lozi =

Prime minister of Jordan

- أحمد اللوزي
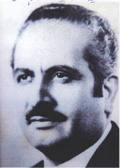

Prime Minister of Jordan
- In office 29 November 1971 – 26 May 1973
- Monarch: Hussein
- Preceded by: Wasfi al-Tal
- Succeeded by: Zaid al-Rifai

Minister of Finance
- In office 1970
- Prime Minister: Wasfi Tal
- Preceded by: Fawwaz Al-Rousan
- Succeeded by: Anis Mouasher

President of the Senate
- In office 12 January 1984 – 8 June 1997
- Preceded by: Fayez Ahmed al-Tarawneh
- Succeeded by: Zaid al-Rifai

Personal details
- Born: 1925 Jubaiha, Amman, Emirate of Transjordan
- Died: 18 November 2014 (aged 89)
- Party: Independent

Ahmad Lozi OSJ (also spelled Ahmad al-Lawzi; 1925 – 18 November 2014) was a Jordanian politician. He served as the Prime Minister of Jordan from 29 November 1971 to 26 May 1973. He succeeded Wasfi al-Tal who had been assassinated by the Black September Organization. In the 1960s he had already served as member of the House of Representatives and the Senate. He also had terms as Minister for Prime ministry affairs, Municipal Affairs and Finance. He served as Chief of the Royal Court from 1979 to 1984. This was followed by the presidency of the Senate for thirteen years, from 1984 to 1997. In 2011 he headed a committee to oversee changes to the Constitution of Jordan.

== Early life ==
Lozi was born in Jubaiha, near Amman in 1925. Lozi studied at the Teachers Training College in Baghdad, Iraq, receiving a degree in literature in 1950. From 1950 to 1953 he worked at two schools as a teacher, the Salt Secondary School and Al Hussein Secondary School in Amman. He then started working as a civil servant, first for the Royal Court and later the Ministry of Foreign Affairs.

== Political career ==
In 1956 he was appointed the head of Royal Protocol. As head of the royal protocol he accompanied King Hussein of Jordan on a world tour between February and May 1959. After work as chief protocol for five years, in 1961, he was elected to the House of Representatives for the district of Amman. During his term in office he was supportive of the government positions on the issue of Palestine and the Syrian revolt. He was subsequently re-elected the year after. In 1964 he was Minister for Prime ministry affairs. The same year he was also Minister without portfolio. Lozi was a member of the Senate of Jordan between 1965 and 1967. In 1967 he was named Minister for Municipal Affairs.

An appointment to Minister of Finance followed in 1970. He started serving as Prime Minister of Jordan from 29 November 1971. He succeeded Wasfi al-Tal who had been assassinated the day before by the Black September Organization. He stayed on as Prime Minister until 1973, he became ill in May and resigned on 26 May 1973.

From 1978 to 1979 he was President of the National Consultative Council. Lozi served as Chief of the Royal Court between 1979 and 1984. On 11 January 1984 King Hussein of Jordan dissolved the senate and replaced it the next day. Lozi was made President of the Senate, he would serve from 1984 to 1997. He resigned on 7 June 1997 and was succeeded the next day by Zaid al-Rifai.

Concerning the democratization of Jordan in the 1990s he said that: "on the whole, I don't think that even the Prophets Jesus or Muhammed could bring about a faster movement toward democracy".

== Later life ==
After having resigned from the Senate in 1997 Lozi became chairman of the board of trustees of the University of Jordan in 2000.

In his later years he was still involved in politics, albeit not in an official government position. In 2011 King Abdullah II of Jordan asked Lozi to head a committee to oversee possible changes to the Constitution of Jordan. Lozi said the intended goal of the committee was to make it "more responsive to change and to the development of the democratic process". The committee argued to transfer some of the powers of the King to parliament and to enhance some civil liberties. Critics said the ideas of the committee were not far-enough reaching yet.

In June 2014 Lozi opened the Habes Al Majali Museum on Army Day. In August 2014 public figures, including King Abdullah II of Jordan met at Lozi's Amman house to talk about challenges to the Jordanian state.

== Personal life ==
Abdul Karim al-Kabariti, who served as Prime Minister of Jordan from February 1996 to March 1997 is the brother-in-law of Lozi.

== Death ==
Lozi died on Tuesday 18 November 2014, aged 89. He was buried in the Royal Cemetery the day after. The ceremony was attended by Prince Feisal bin Al Hussein in his capacity as regent.

== Honours and awards ==
=== Jordan ===
- Supreme Order of the Renaissance, Wisam al-Nahda.
- Order of the Star of Jordan, Wisam al-Kawkab al-Urdani, first order.
- Order of Independence, Wisam al-Istiqial, first order.

Political offices
| Preceded by Wasfi al-Tal | Prime Minister of Jordan; 1971–1973 | Succeeded by Zaid al-Rifai |
