= University of Jordan =

Public university in Amman, Jordan

Coordinates: 32°0′50″N 35°52′22″E

- الجامعة الأردنية
- Motto: Arabic: ويعلمكم الكتاب والحكمة
- Motto in English: And he teaches you the book and wisdom
- Type: Public
- Established: 2 September 1962; 64 years ago
- Affiliations: IAU, FUIW, UNIMED, AArU
- Endowment: 4,800,000 JOD ($6.77 million USD) (2015)
- Chairman: Adnan Badran
- President: Nathir Obeidat
- Academic staff: 1,485 (2019/2020)
- Administrative staff: 2,415 (2019/2020)
- Students: 46,951 (2020/2021)
- Undergraduates: 40,142 (2020/2021)
- Postgraduates: 6,765 (2020/2021)
- Location: Amman, Jordan
- Campus: Urban 1.2 square kilometres (300 acres)
- Colors: Royal yellow and Green ^{[a]}
- Website: ju.edu.jo

The University of Jordan (Arabic: الجامعة الأردنية; abbreviated UJ or JU) is a public university located in Amman, Jordan. Founded in 1962, and it is the largest and oldest institution of higher education in Jordan. It is located in the capital Amman in the Jubaiha District of Amman. The university comprises 25 faculties and offers 91 bachelor's programs and 161 postgraduate programs. According to its published strategy, it aims to strengthen its international profile and productivity across academic fields.

Enrollment grew from about 35,000 students in the early 2000s to roughly 45,000 by the mid-2010s, surpassing 50,000 in 2019. The university reports more than 200,000 graduates. Its student body includes about 12% international students. The faculty numbers roughly 1,600 members, about one-third of whom hold the rank of full professor. Most of them earned their academic qualifications at institutions in the United States, Europe, Asia, and the Arab world, in addition to who are University of Jordan alumni. The University District is considered to be one of the most developed parts of Amman, with a rich history of education, culture, and a high population density. Also, its street is a main street and one of the most vibrant streets in the city.

In terms of recognition, the University of Jordan has secured the top spot locally and ranked 324th globally in the QS World University Rankings for 2026. This further solidifies its position as a leading academic institution.

== Campuses ==
=== Amman ===
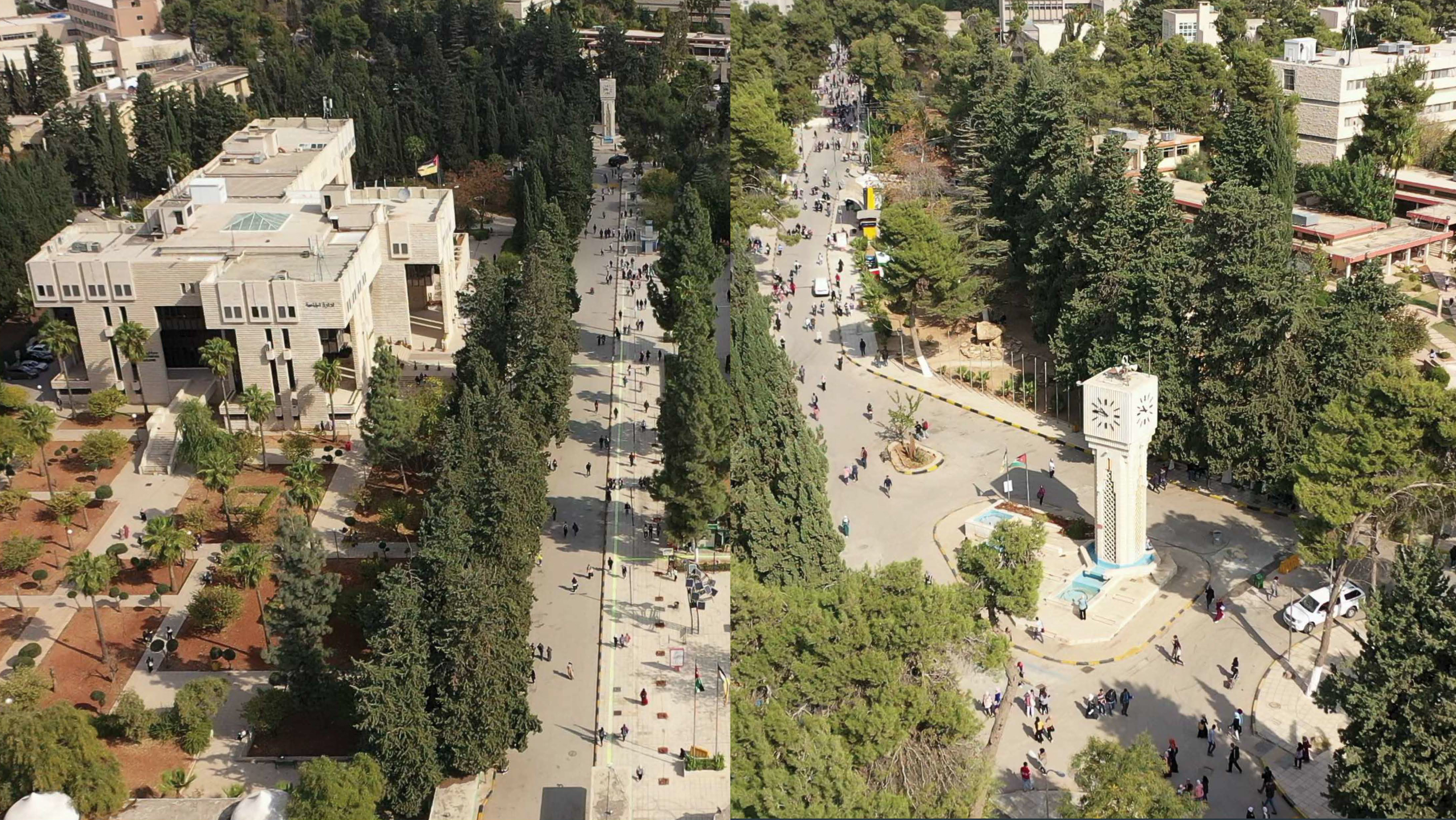
Aerial view of Amman campus

In 1962, the University of Jordan selected Jubaiha area as the construction site for its campus. Situated north of the capital, Amman, the conservatory offered ample space, picturesque views adorned with ancient cypress and pine trees, and a central location, close to significant landmarks in Jordan.

Spanning an area of 1,200 dunums, equivalent to 0.463 square miles (1.20 km2), The university's main campus in Jubaiha borders University Street (Queen Rania Street), a major road connecting eastern and western Amman. The corridor includes cafés, restaurants, hotels, and student housing, and it is a common destination for students and visitors.

The campus has twelve gates, including one on the southern side, two on the eastern side, two on the northern side, and seven on the western side, notably the University Street side, which includes the main entrance. Also, the university designates four lots for student parking: near the School of Arts (south campus), the Admissions and Registration Unit by University Street, the School of Education at the northern gate, and the Scientific Parking area on the eastern side of the scientific faculties.

=== Aqaba ===
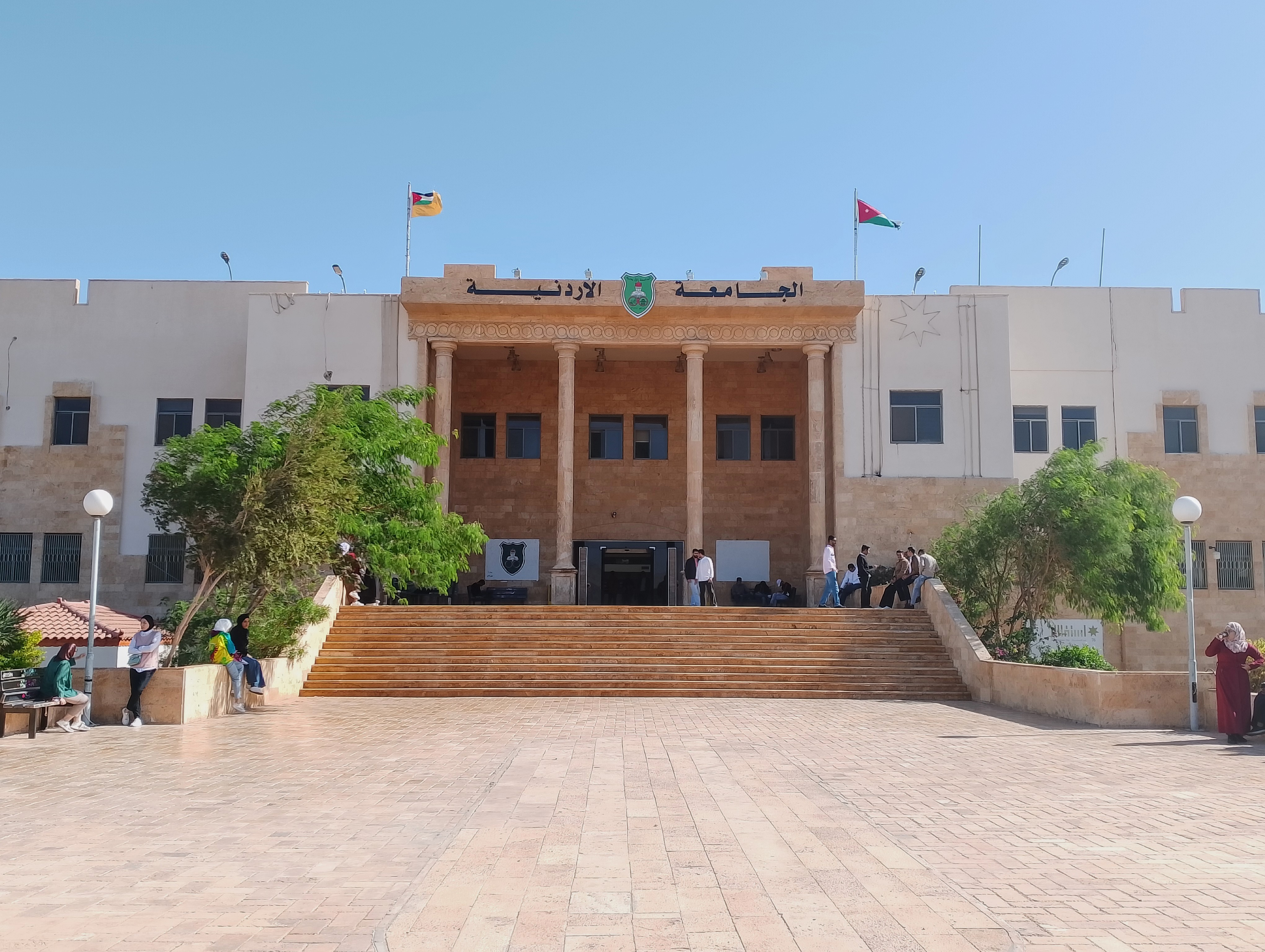
Aqaba branch

Aqaba Campus is the southern branch of the University of Jordan. It is located in Aqaba, Jordan, and was established in 2009 as part of a national strategy to expand higher education and spur development in the Aqaba region. His Majesty King Abdullah II laid its foundation stone in April 2009. The campus is located on the northern outskirts of Aqaba and offers a range of facilities and infrastructure to support student life. It features modern academic buildings. Recreational and sports facilities are also part of the campus, such as a multi-purpose gymnasium for indoor sports and other leisure amenities available to students. In 2024, the university began construction of a dedicated women's dormitory within the campus.

== History ==
=== Establishment ===
Before the University of Jordan was founded, Jordanians repeatedly called for establishing a national university. In the 1950s, many students pursued higher education abroad. In 1962, a British Army delegation met with the commanders of the Jordanian Army to negotiate terms for aid from the British government intended to help with the establishment of the University of Jordan. Before issuing the royal decree, King Hussein bin Talal discussed the project with Prime Minister Wasfi al-Tal, and they agreed to proceed. The king tasked al-Tal with leading the university's establishment. The royal decree stated:

... We firmly believe in all of these factors and in response to them, and in accordance with Article 40 of the Constitution, as well as the decision made by our Council of Ministers, we hereby declare our intention as follows: A university shall be founded in the Hashemite Kingdom of Jordan, to be named the University of Jordan, with its main campus situated at the Jubaiha site in the capital city of the Kingdom.

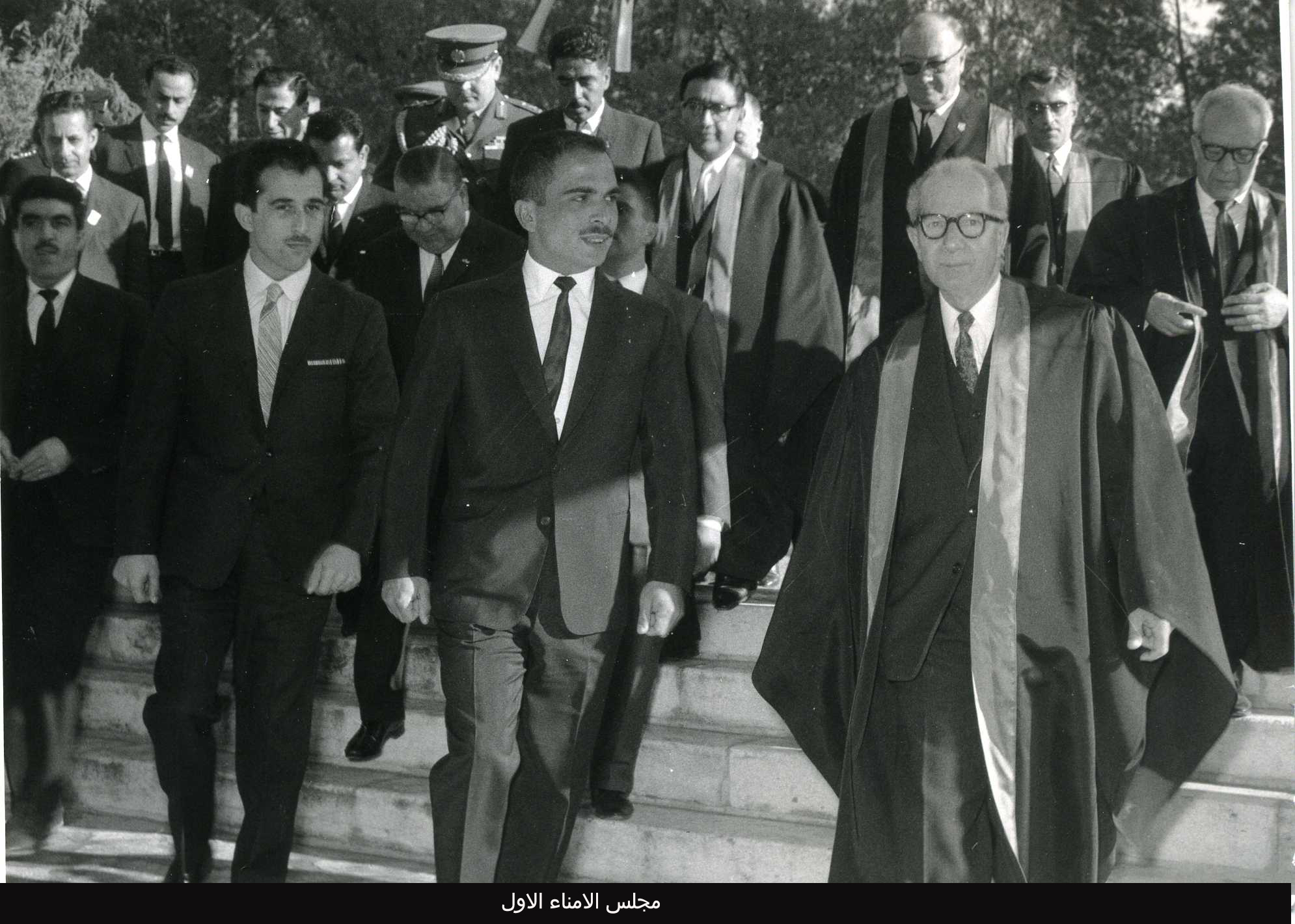
During the founding of the university, King Hussein bin Talal toured the premises accompanied by Prince Mohammed, the university president, members of the board of trustees, and Prime Minister Wasfi al-Tal.

On the Opening ceremony of the university, King Hussein bin Talal, accompanied by his convoy, Prince Hassan bin Talal, and Jordanian Prime Minister Wasfi al-Tal, arrived at the university. They were warmly welcomed by the university's president, Nasir al-Din al-Asad, the head of the Board of Trustees, Samir Al-Rifai, and other members of the Board of Trustees.

During a ceremony held on 17 April 1965, King Hussein was presented with the university's first degree, an honorary doctorate. In a speech at the university auditorium, King Hussein said that establishing the university had long been a national aspiration and expressed his pride at its realization:

With fervent and faithful words, I proudly declare, on behalf of the unified Jordanian family, the establishment of the University of Jordan in our beloved country on the second day of September 1962. Today, I stand here, grateful to God, witnessing the joyous celebration of the inauguration of our beloved university. It brings me great joy to hold its certificate, robe, and badge. I offer my heartfelt gratitude to the Almighty, whose power knows no bounds.

— During the opening ceremony of the university on April 17, 1965, King Hussein bin Talal.

=== Early history ===
On 25 December 1965, the University of Jordan commenced its first day of teaching. At its inception, the university operated from three buildings with a budget of 50,000 dinars and eight faculty members, along with a small number of international professors. Early faculty included Nasir al-Din al-Asad, Abdul-Karim Gharaybeh, Fakher Aqel, Shawqi Daif, and Hashim Yaghi. The sole college was the Faculty of Arts, and enrollment was 167 students, including 17 female students.

In its early years, the administration expanded infrastructure and added new faculties. In 1965, the School of Science and the School of Economics and Commerce were established alongside the School of Arts.

Jordanian media in late 1962 referred to the University of Jordan as "the Mother University". It was the first university established in the country. Early activities included the Samir Al-Rifai Theater hosting the first Jordanian theater production and a Department of Sociology initiative credited as the first Jordanian community project. The university also introduced a credit hour system, cited as the first in the Arab world. In its early years, it was organized as a state university that operated independently of the government, with scientific, financial, and administrative autonomy.

In its early years, instruction was in Arabic for the humanities and in English for scientific and technical fields. The humanities faculties included scholars such as Nasir al-Din al-Asad, Shawqi Daif, Hashem Yaghi, Nihad al-Mousa, Ibrahim al-Samarrai, and Abdulkareem Khalefah. The university initially followed an annual academic system, in 1968 it adopted a more flexible structure that broadened students' course choices.

=== 1970–1990: Expansion and economic challenges ===
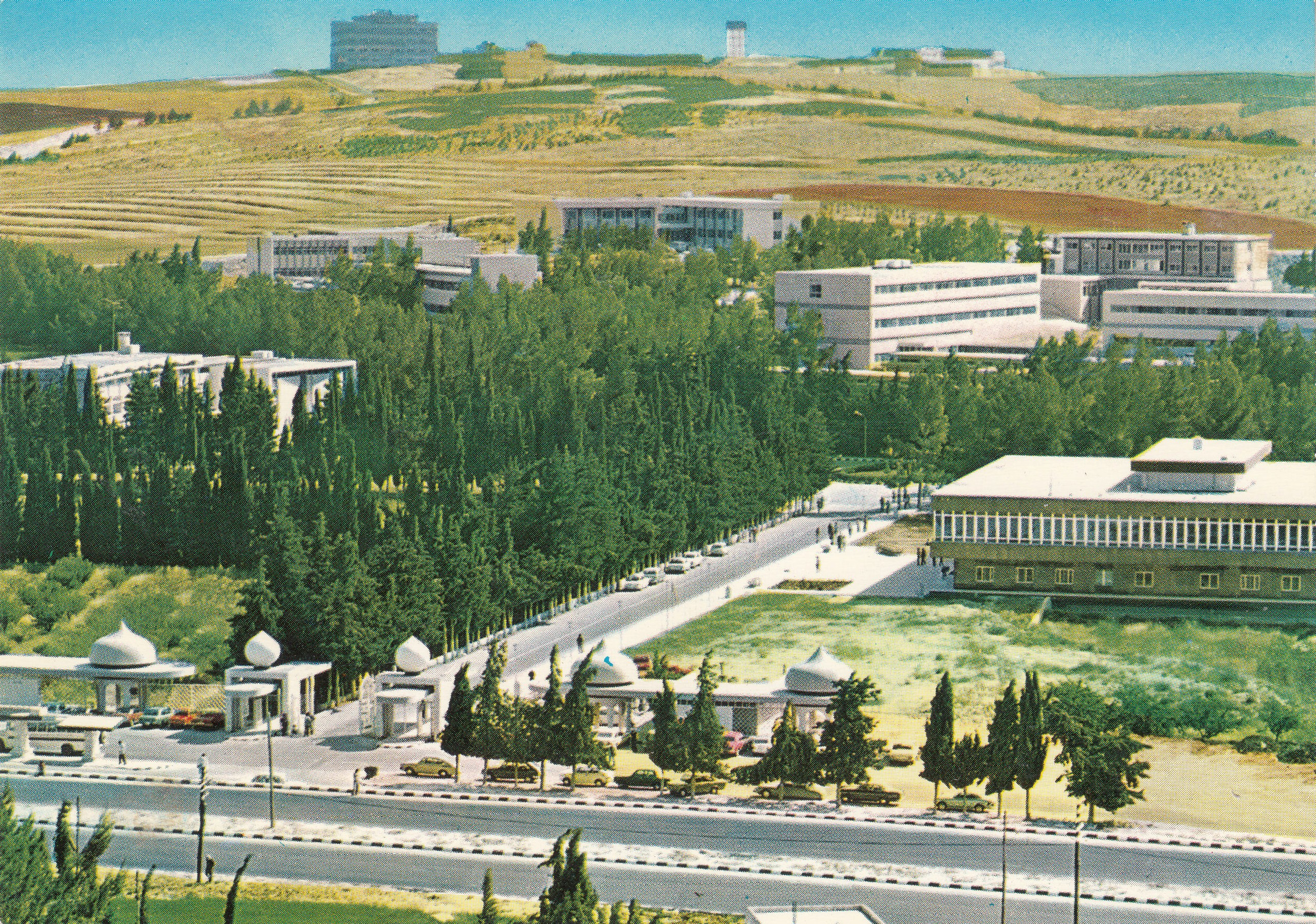
Main entrance and campus buildings in 1972

Despite political and security disruptions in Jordan in the late 1960s and early 1970s (including regional hostilities and the Black September conflict), the University of Jordan expanded. Between 1970 and 1990 it added new faculties and established research centers. During this period, Jordan's economy grew with financial assistance from the United States and several Arab states. The university added ten faculties, including Medicine, Dentistry, Pharmacy, Engineering, Nursing, Agriculture, Law, and Physical Education. Also, it created eight research centers, and established its teaching hospital (JUH).

Other developments included establishing the Deanship of Student Affairs and the Deanship of Scientific Research. The university mosque was inaugurated on 10 June 1980 in a ceremony attended by King Hussein and Prince Hassan. On 6 April 1982, a royal decree established the Islamic Cultural Center.

Financial support for the university fluctuated during this period. It was increased from 225,000 Jordanian dinars in 1970 to 950,000 dinars by 1990.

=== 1990–2000: Democratization and student movements ===
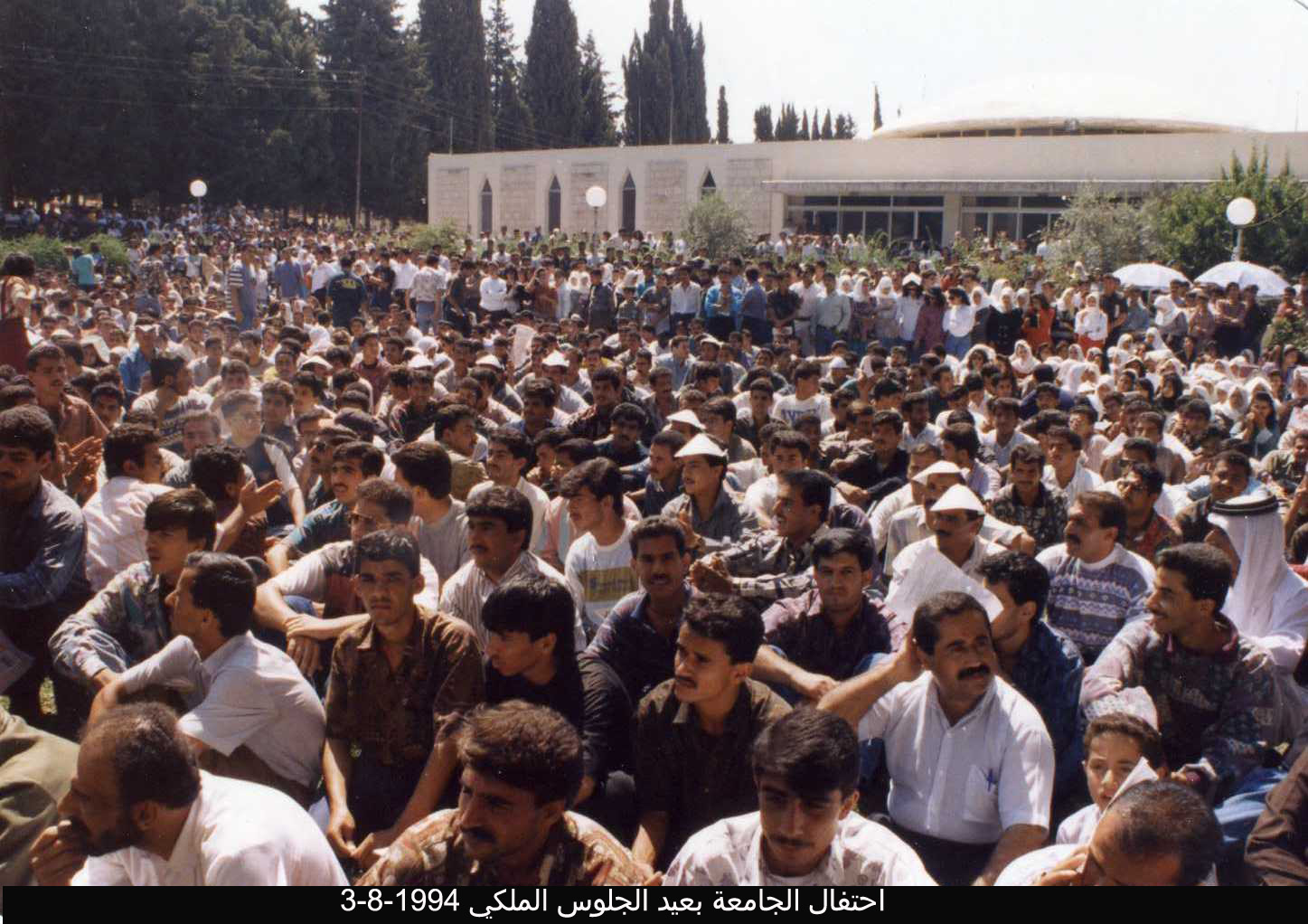
University students celebrate the royal seating day, August 3, 1994.

Following the lifting of martial law in Jordan, a period of political liberalization coincided with continued expansion at the university. In the 1990s, student activism intensified, including calls to establish a national student union, beginning at the University of Jordan.

During this period, the administration adopted a single-vote system for electing student representatives to the University Council. A preparatory committee was elected in 1990, and in 1992 a Student Council was established, distinct from a full student union. University policies remained aligned with national political direction, which led to periodic tensions between student groups and administrators.

In 1998, the University Board of Trustees was reinstated, and the university regained academic, administrative, and financial autonomy. The Higher Education Council's authority for accreditation and quality assurance was transferred to the Accreditation Council.

=== 2000–Present: Expansion and research development ===
During this period, the university established its Aqaba branch, introduced parallel and international admission programs, adopted blended learning, and student activism on campus increased.

In 2000, government funding to the university fell to 400,000 Jordanian dinars. In the following years, the enrollment and faculty numbers increased. The university introduced new admission categories in 2000. It also admitted large cohorts under scholarship schemes based on social and political criteria. They included grants for students from under-served regions, tribal communities, and the children of military and security personnel.

In 2008, during the presidency of Khaled Al-Karaki, the university established its Aqaba branch, and began operating in 2009. From 2000 to 2011, the university reported 78 patents, 752 books, and 8,764 research papers by its faculty.

A significant institutional milestone was achieved in 2008 under the presidency of Khaled Al-Karaki when the university established its Aqaba branch, which began operations in 2009. Between 2000 and 2011, the university registered 78 patents, published 752 books, and produced 8,764 research papers authored by its faculty members.

In the early 2010s, the administration adopted a plan to position the University of Jordan as an internationally oriented, research-focused institution. The plan allocated 5% of the annual budget to scientific research, and graduate offerings expanded to 111 master's programs, 38 doctoral programs, and 16 higher-specialization programs in medicine.

Student activism also intensified during the 2010s, with several influential student organizations shaping campus political discourse. Prominent electoral lists included Nashama, Ahl Al-Himma, Al-Awda, Al-Karama, and Al-Tajdeed, among others.

In 2012, during the university's Golden Jubilee, King Abdullah II inaugurated the celebration at Al-Hassan Bin Talal Auditorium, where former university presidents were honored and several new facilities were opened. In his address, the university president reported that since its founding the University of Jordan had graduated 159,383 students.

== Academics ==
=== Schools ===
The University of Jordan offers undergraduate and postgraduate programs. It has 78 undergraduate programs and 143 postgraduate programs which are divided into 109 master's degrees, and 34 doctoral degrees. Faculties are organized into three streams: Scientific faculties, Humanitarian faculties, and Medical (Health) faculties.

==== Scientific faculties ====
| School | Founded |
| Science | 1965 |
| Agriculture | 1973 |
| Engineering | 1975 |
| Information Technology | 2000 |

The scientific faculties include the School of Science, School of Agriculture, School of Engineering, and the King Abdullah II School of Information Technology. These faculties collectively cover the natural and applied sciences, from fundamental scientific disciplines (in the School of Science) and agricultural studies (in the School of Agriculture) to various engineering fields and information technology programs. The School of Engineering, established in 1975, has grown to be the university's largest faculty. It comprises departments in civil, electrical, mechanical, chemical, industrial, and other engineering areas; notably, by 2021 all its departments had attained ABET accreditation. The King Abdullah II School for Information Technology (KASIT) was founded in 2000 under the patronage of King Abdullah II. It focuses on computer science and IT education and was created to advance the information technology sector in Jordan.

==== Humanitarian faculties ====
| School | Founded |
| Arts | 1962 |
| Sharia | 1964 |
| Business | 1965 |
| Educational Sciences | 1972 |
| Law | 1976 |
| Physical Education | 1979 |
| Arts and Design | 2002 |
| Foreign Languages | 2008 |
| International Studies | 2008 |
| Archaeology and Tourism | 2012 |

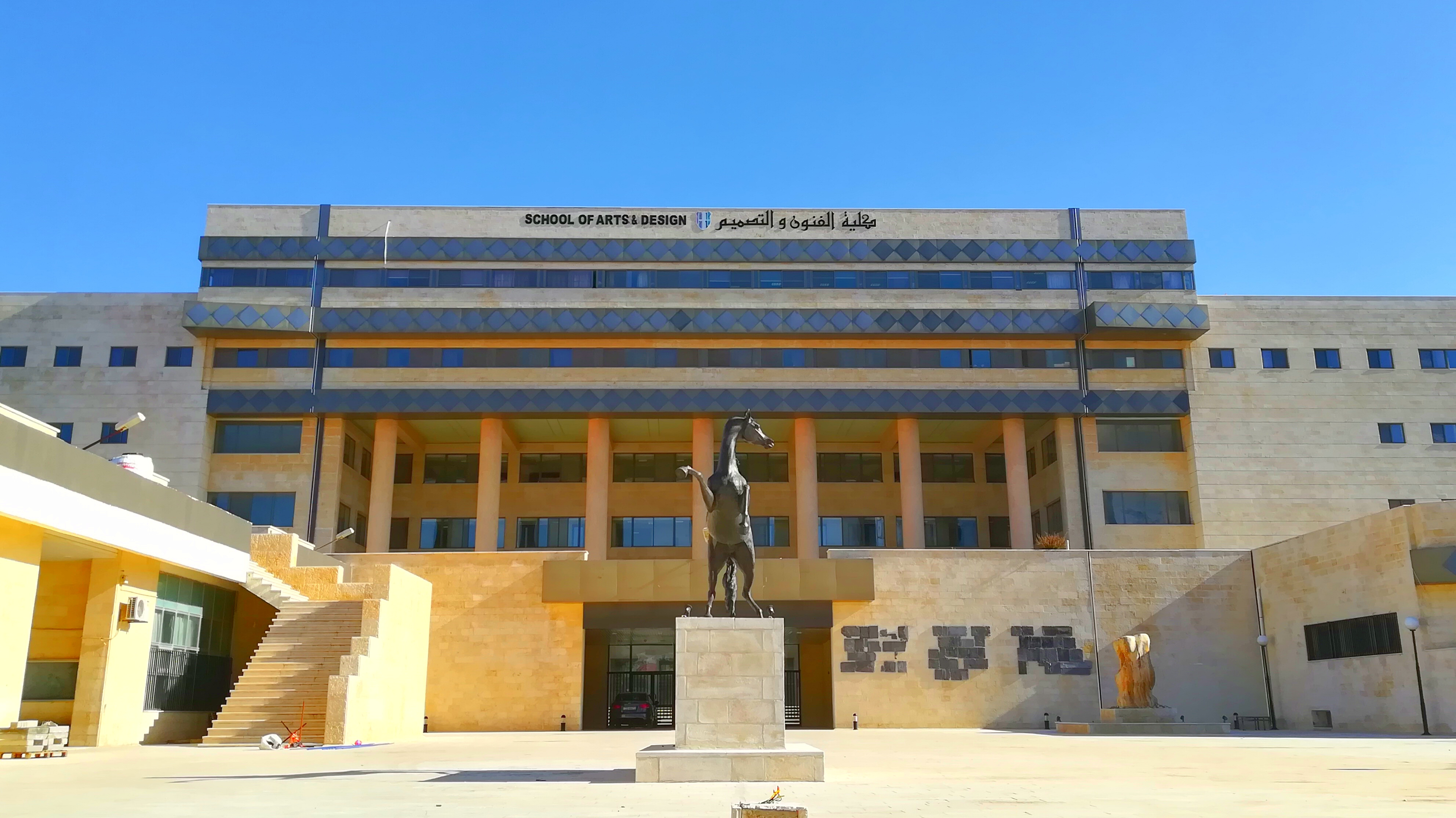
School of Arts and Design

The university has ten humanities faculties. Most of the humanities faculties are located in the northern part of the university. They encompass a broad range of non-scientific disciplines and professional fields. This group includes the School of Arts, School of Sharia (Islamic studies), School of Business, School of Educational Sciences, School of Law, and School of Physical Education, as well as the School of Arts and Design, Prince Al Hussein Bin Abdullah II School of International Studies, School of Foreign Languages, and School of Archaeology and Tourism.

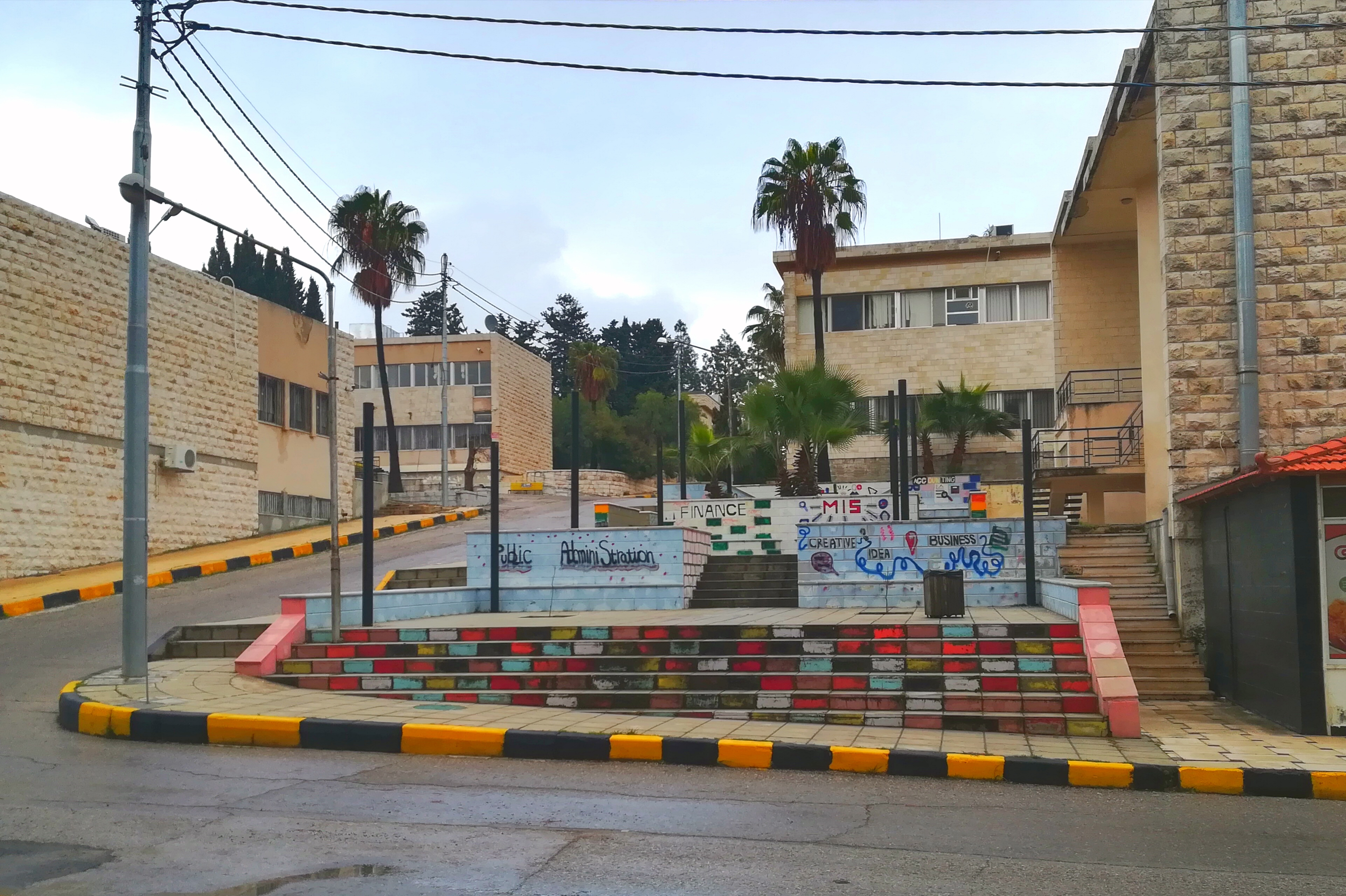
School of Business

The first school in the history of Jordan is the School of Arts. It is a leading center for humanities, social sciences, and literature, while the School of Sharia (established in 1964 as the university's fourth college) focuses on Islamic theology and jurisprudence. The School of Business, founded in 1965, comprises seven departments (such as management, finance, and accounting) and was the first public university business school in Jordan to achieve AACSB accreditation. The School of Physical Education (also known as the School of Sport Sciences) provides programs in sports science and physical training. Specialized schools like the School of Arts and Design (established 2002) foster fine arts and design education, and the Prince Al Hussein Bin Abdullah II School of International Studies (established 2008) is dedicated to politics and international relations. It is one of the only academic institutions in Jordan specializing in those fields in English. Also, the School of Foreign Languages offers degree programs in a variety of languages and literature. Other faculties in this category include the School of Archaeology and Tourism, the School of Educational Sciences and the School of Law.

==== Medical faculties ====
| School | Founded |
| Medicine | 1971 |
| Nursing | 1972 |
| Pharmacy | 1980 |
| Dentistry | 1984 |
| Rehabilitation Sciences | 1999 |

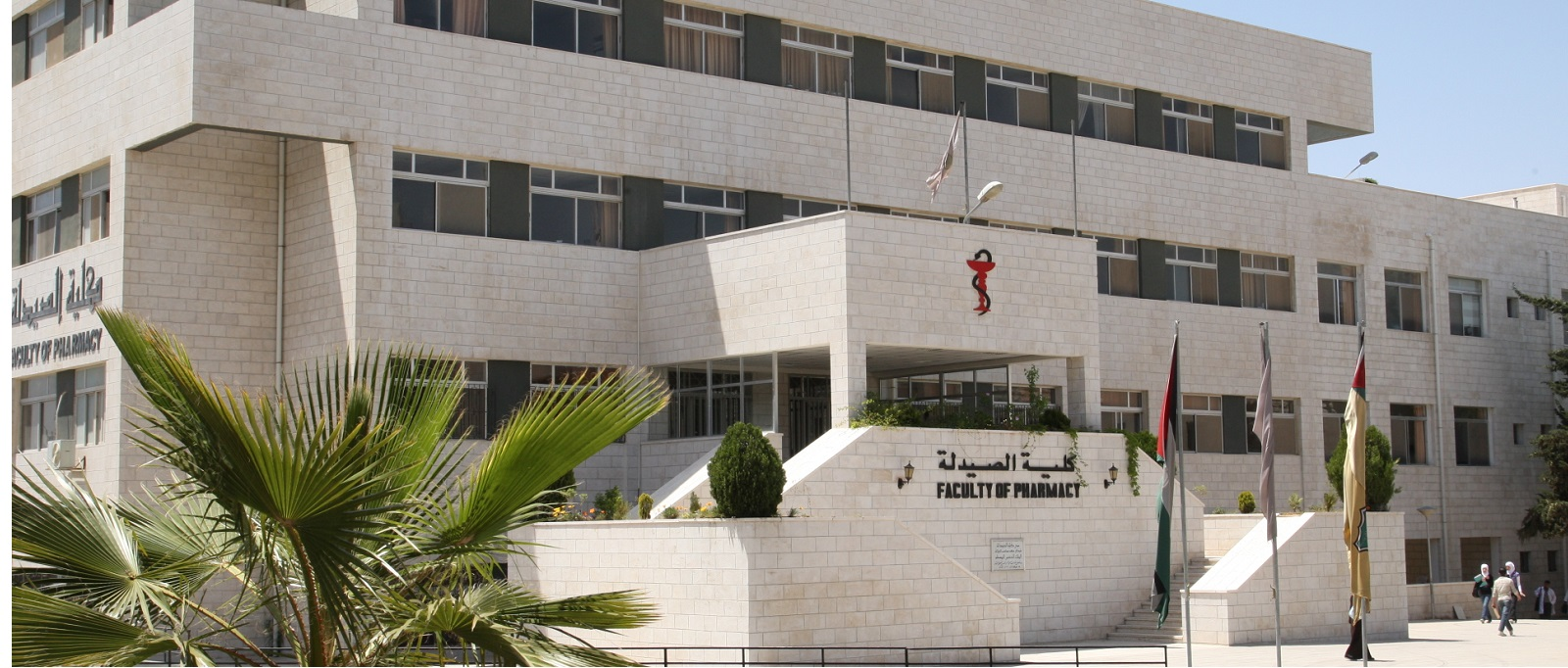
School of Pharmacy

The medical and health faculties consist of the School of Medicine, School of Nursing, School of Pharmacy, School of Dentistry, and the School of Rehabilitation Sciences. The School of Medicine was established in 1971. It is the first medical school in Jordan. Also, the School of Nursing, opened in 1972, was the first program in the country to offer a bachelor's degree in nursing. It played a key role in training professional nurses for Jordan's healthcare system. The School of Pharmacy was founded in 1979 as Jordan's first pharmacy faculty, and the School of Dentistry followed in 1982 to train dentists in oral health and dental surgery. The School of Rehabilitation Sciences (established in 1999) is one of the university's youngest faculties. It is specialised in health fields such as physiotherapy, occupational therapy, prosthetics, and speech and hearing sciences.

=== Library (UJL) ===
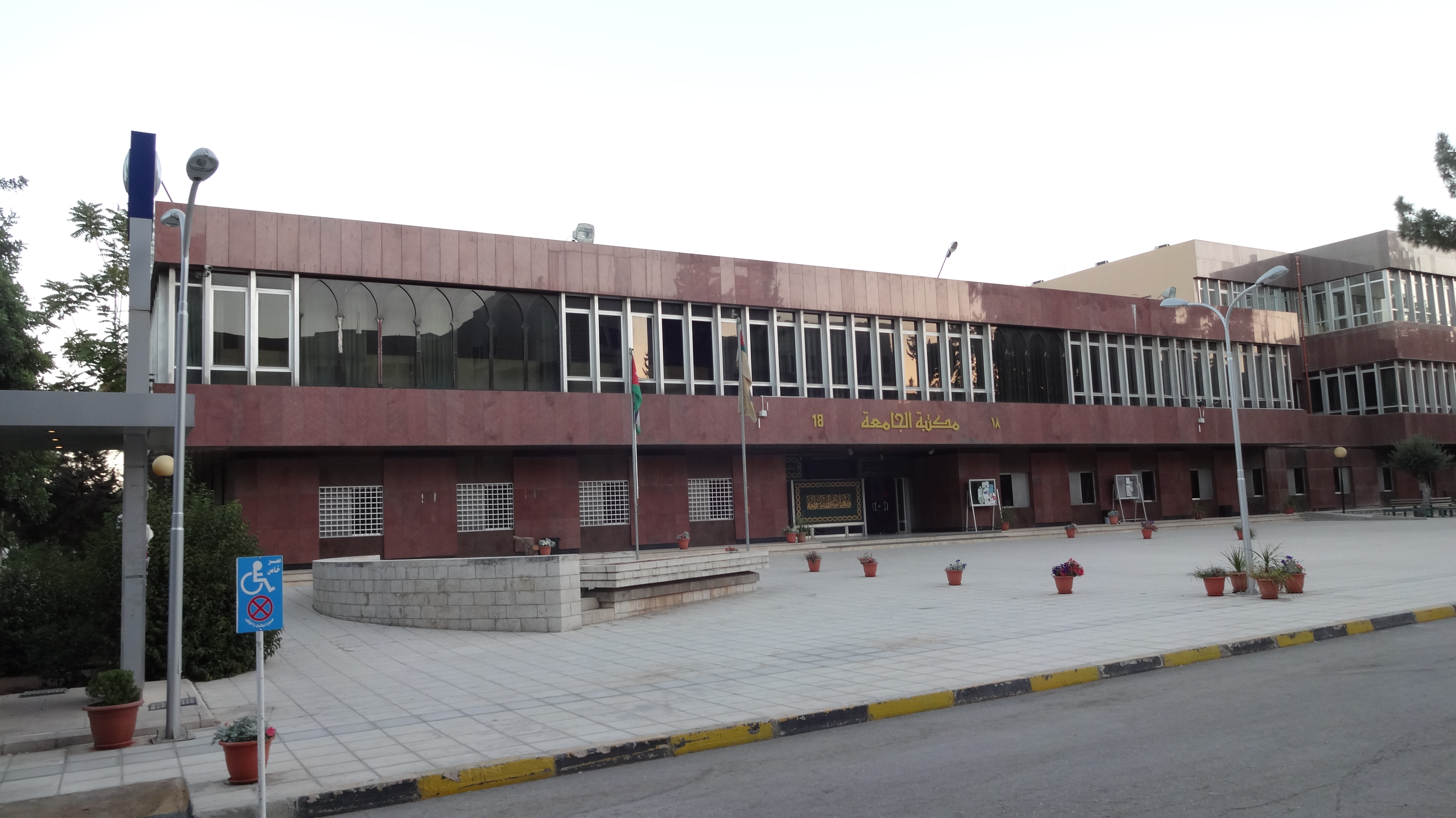
UJL from the north side

The University of Jordan Library (UJL) was established in 1962. It was established with the founding of the university. It occupies more than 12,000 square meters, with an additional 4,000 square meters of reading rooms distributed across faculties and research centers. Its collection exceeds one million print and electronic items and serves faculty, students, researchers, and visiting scholars. It was the second public library in Jordan, after the Central Library founded in 1960. The UJL is organized into three departments: Technical, Library Services, and Information. These departments manage acquisitions, cataloging and classification, lending, reference, deposits, and library systems. Holdings include historical documents and archives, parliamentary minutes, newspaper runs dating to 1870, and records from Jerusalem's Sharia courts and the Mamluk Sultanate. It also serves as a depository for United Nations and other international-organization documents. An American Corner opened in September 2018. The library is open 90 hours per week, and serves about 11,000 users daily. Also, it provides facilities for visually impaired students. Since 1986 it has been a repository for theses and dissertations from Arab universities accredited by the Association of Arab Universities. The UJL provides an online catalog (Horizon) and other digital access services.

=== Centers and institutes ===
==== Institutes ====
- Institute of Archaeology
- International Institute for Teaching Arabic Language to Speakers of Other Languages
- Social Work Institute
- Institute of agricultural research training extension and education
- The Institute for the Study of Islam in the Contemporary World

==== Centers ====
- Center for Photonics Research
- The University of Jordan Language Center

Directed at offering courses of Arabic language as a foreign language.

- The Jordan Academy of Arabic

One of 10 academies in the world that regulate Arabic language and literature. The academy is considered one of the world's top references for Arabic language and Arabic literature. The main publication of the academy is the biannual journal "The Journal of Jordan Academy of Arabic" (ISSN 0258-1094), as well as many dictionaries and other publications.

- The Islamic Cultural Center

Established in 1982, it provides support for researchers on Islamic studies, it also organizes courses and seminars for Islamic history and literature scholars.

- The Center for Documents and Manuscripts

Established in 1972 to promote the study of Arabic and Islamic heritage, and to provide researchers with original and primary sources. The CDM library boasts 31,000 manuscripts.

- Water and Environment Research and Study Center

The objective of the establishment of the center is to provide research in water management and environment on the regional and international level.

- Deanship of Research and Graduate Studies

The University of Jordan launched its first graduate program in 1968/69, it was an MA program in Educational Administration and Guidance, the faculty cooperates with:

1. Jordan Media Institute which offers a one–year practical master's degree.
2. The National Center for Diabetes, Endocrinology and Genetics, which offers MA and High Diploma.
- Center for Strategic Studies Jordan

The center was established in 1998 aiming to perform political and economical studies on the national and regional level. The center also performs polls with high levels of accuracy. The center occasionally performs studies for Aljazeera.

== Jordan university hospital ==
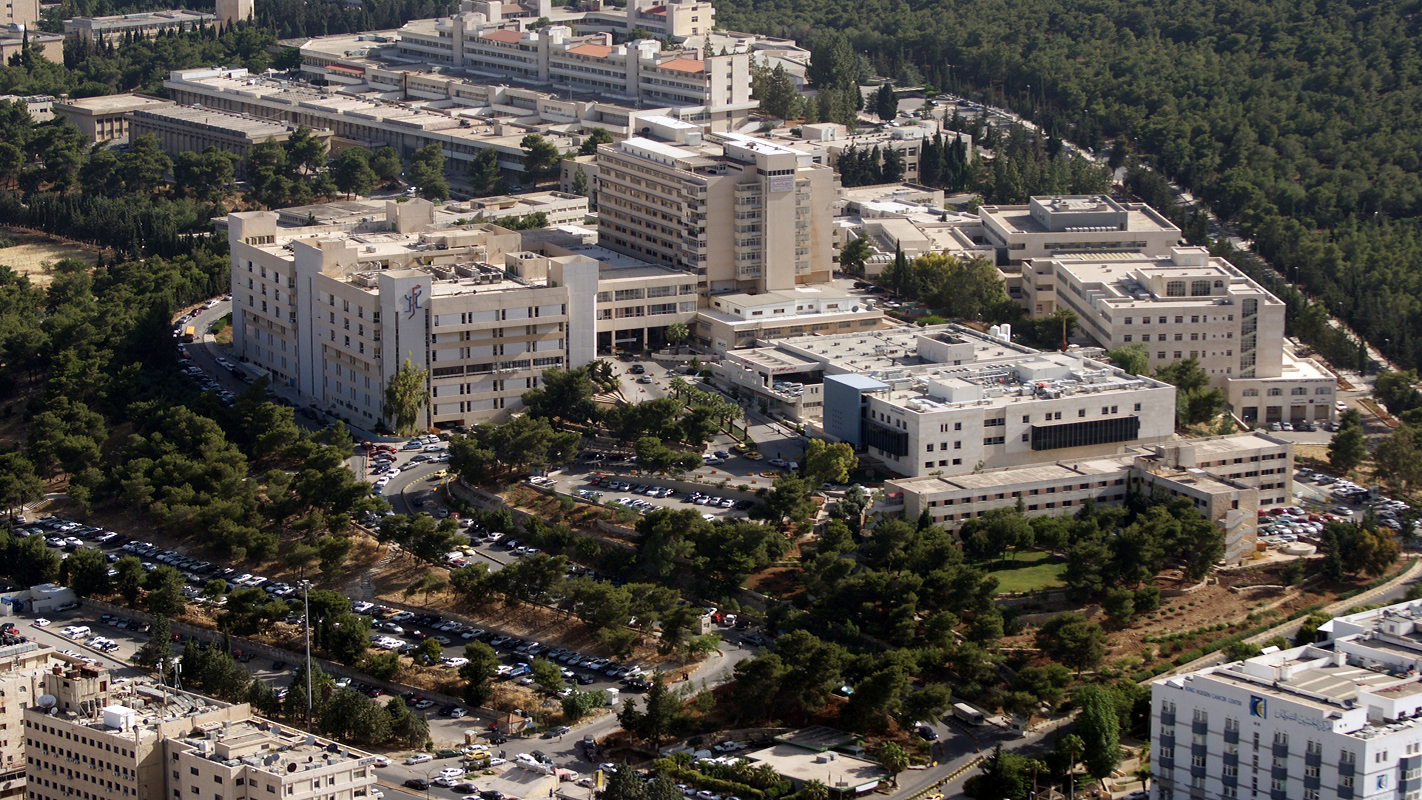
Jordan University Hospital building

Jordan University Hospital (JUH) is a public teaching and research hospital in Amman. It was founded in 1973 under the name Grand Amman Hospital. It became the country's first university teaching hospital in 1975 when it was incorporated into the University of Jordan and renamed Jordan University Hospital. JUH offers a comprehensive range of medical services across numerous specialties and has introduced advanced procedures such as cochlear implants and bone marrow transplants. It also serves as a major center for medical education and research. It provides clinical training for medical, nursing, and allied health students, and it supports postgraduate specialist training. Notably, JUH was the first hospital in the Arab region (and the second in the Middle East) to achieve accreditation from the Joint Commission International (JCI) and Hazard Analysis Critical Control Point (HACCP). It also has affiliations with King Hussein Cancer Center, which was the first Cancer Center outside of the United States to be accredited by the JCI Disease Specific Certification (DSC) in November 2007.

== Scientific research ==
=== Scientific collections ===
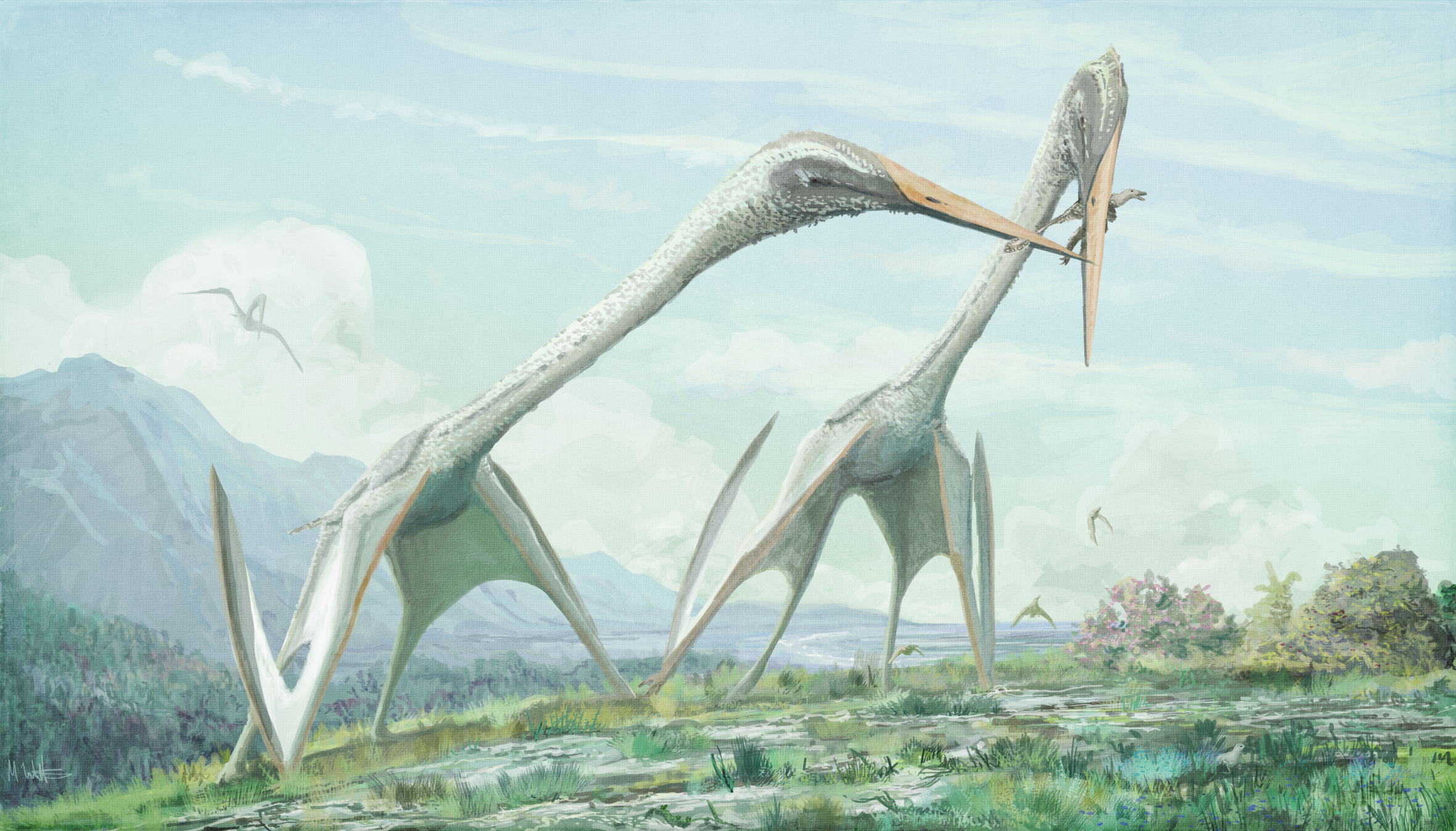
The world's only discovered fossil bones of the Arambourgiania pterosaur (discovered in Russeifa in 1943) are stored in the University of Jordan.

The university research facilities contain collections of historic documents and manuscripts as well as fossil remains that are considered to be of valuable importance for the scientific community, "to provide primary and secondary sources for researchers", among which are the world's only discovered fossil bones of Arambourgiania.

=== Jordan university press ===
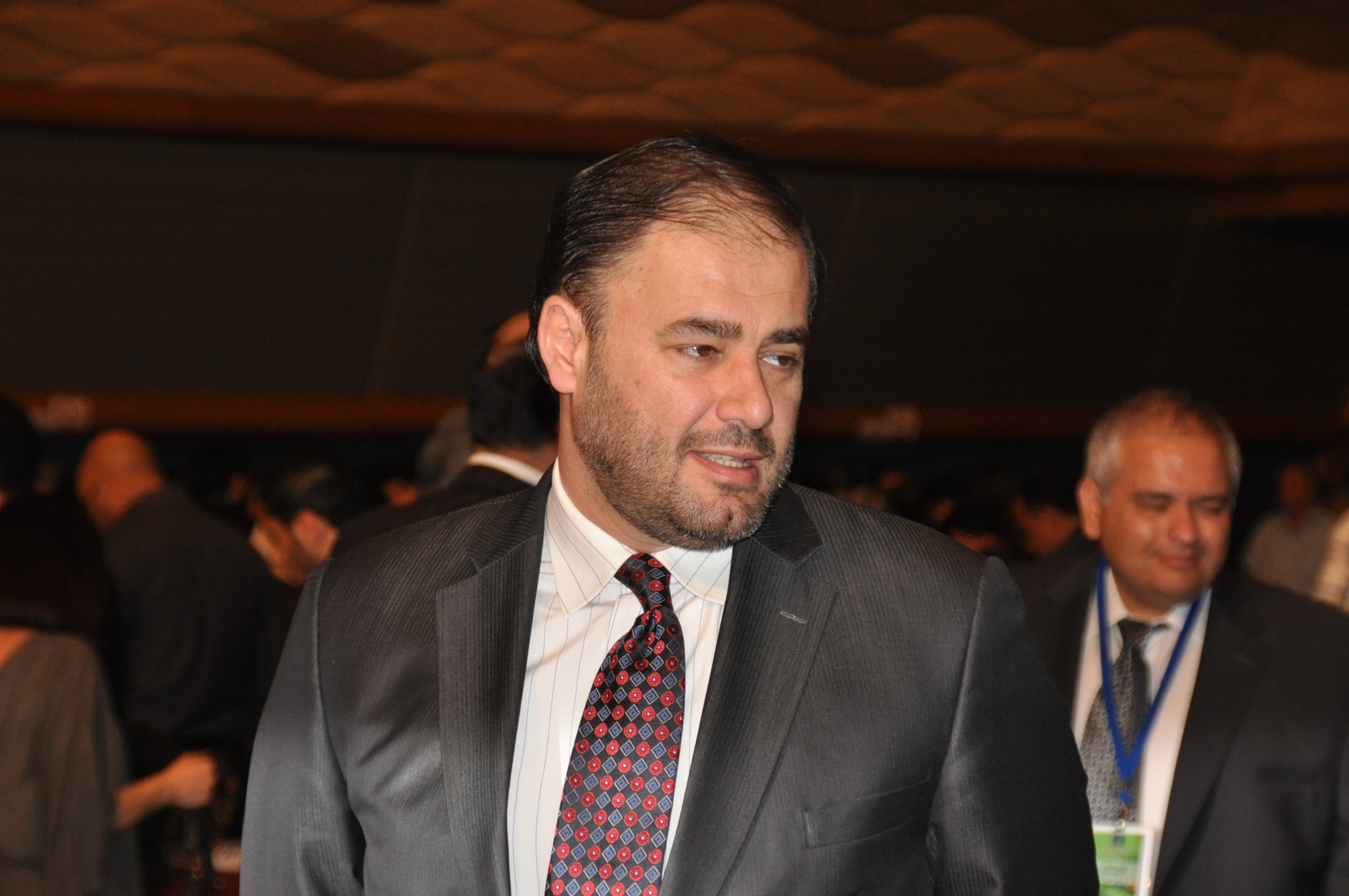
Wadah Khanfar, former director general of Al Jazeera

According to Nature journal, Jordan has the highest number of researchers per million people in the Arab World, and the 30th worldwide. In its objective to promote scientific research, the Jordanian Ministry of Higher Education and Scientific Research established collaboration with the University of Jordan Deanship of Academic Research in the early 1990s to publish several internationally peer-reviewed scientific journals on the highest standards in applied and social sciences as well as medical and pharmaceutical sciences. These journals are:

- Jordan Medical Journal (ISSN 0446-9283) a peer refereed journal for researches in medical sciences and molecular biology.
- Jordan Journal of Pharmaceutical Sciences (ISSN 1995-7157)
- Jordan Journal of Business Administration
- Jordan Journal of Social Sciences
- Jordan Journal for History and Archaeology
- Jordan Journal of Agricultural Sciences

The University of Jordan Press issues the internationally peer-reviewed Dirasat Journal series, and several other journals in Arabic literature, Arabic and Middle Eastern history, and regional culture:

- Aqlam Jadidah, a journal mainly for Arabic literature
- The Cultural Journal, a quarterly published journal in Arabic, founded in 1983.
- Dirasat Journal Series:
  - Agricultural Sciences (ISSN 1026-3764)
  - Human and Social Sciences (ISSN 1026-3721)
  - Administrative Sciences (ISSN 1026-373X)
  - Educational Sciences (ISSN 1026-3713)
  - Engineering Sciences (ISSN 1026-3764)
  - Shari'a and Law Sciences (ISSN 1026-3748)
  - Pure Sciences (ISSN 1560-456X)

=== Rankings ===
University rankings

Global – Overall
- ARWU World: 801–900 (2023)
- QS World: =324 (2026)
- THE World: 601–800 (2024)
- USNWR Global: =866 (2023)

Global – Science and engineering
- ARWU Electrical & Electronic Engineering: 401–500

Regional – Overall
- QS Arab region: 10
- THE Emerging Economies: 179

The University of Jordan has the highest admission scores for most majors in the country. According to the 2021 Webometrics Ranking of World Universities, it was the top ranked university in Jordan and the number 11 university in the Arab world.

In 2022, QS ranked the university in the 591 – 600 band in the world with 5 stars rating, 101 – 450 by subject rankings, tenth in the Arab world and 301 – 500 in graduate employability globally. In the same year, Times Higher Education ranked the university within the 801 – 1000 band globally, 179th for BRICS and Emerging Economies, 250 – 300 in Asian university rankings, and 22nd for Arab University Rankings 2021.

In 2022, the University of Jordan ranked in the 701 – 800 band in Shanghai Academic Ranking of World Universities, and in 151 – 500 band for various subject rankings.

In 2023, the University of Jordan ranked in the 801–900 band in the Shanghai Academic Ranking of World Universities (ARWU) and in the 591–600 band in the QS World University Rankings.

In 2024, the University of Jordan maintained its position in the 801–900 band in the ARWU and improved to the 498th position in the QS World University Rankings

== International affiliations and agreements ==
=== Bilateral agreements ===
The University of Jordan has hundreds of agreements mostly for student exchange programs, of which 16 agreements are with universities in the United States such as Vanderbilt University and Murray State University.

=== Affiliations ===
- International Association of Universities
- Federation of the Universities of the Islamic World
- Mediterranean Universities Union
- Association of Arab Universities

== Students ==
The University of Jordan Student Union is the University's student body.

The regulations governing the Student Union have been subject to several revisions and major changes since its conception. The latest version of these regulations was written by a committee of both students (Hamdoon Khateeb, Malek Khalaileh, Khaled Gabba, Yasmeen AbuTaleb, Issam Khoury) and faculty members (Dr. Ali Mahafzah, Dr. Ali Badran, Dr. Ali Sawwa) and put into effect in 2008.

== Alumni ==
=== Notable professors and faculty ===
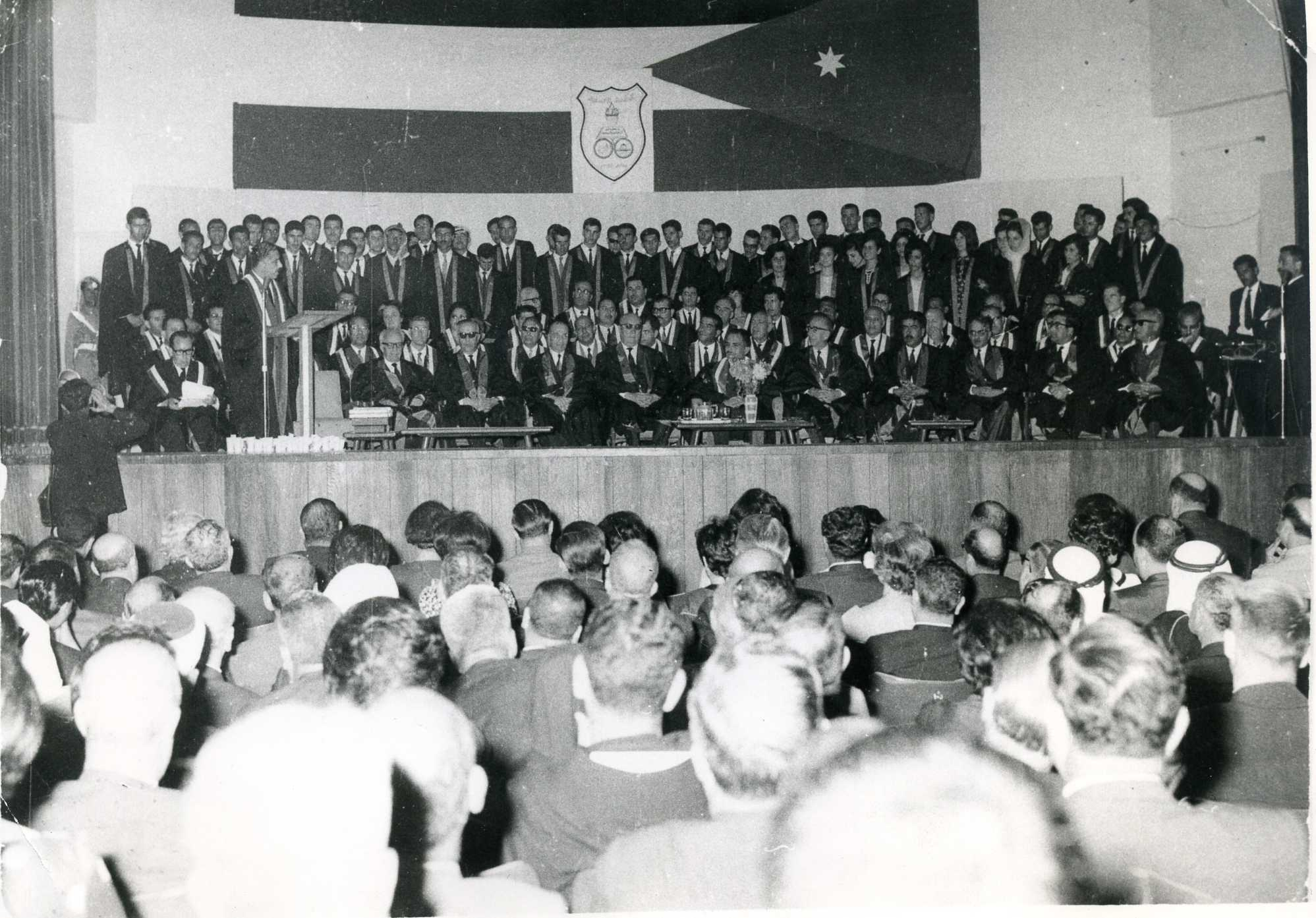
First Cohort of Graduates of University of Jordan, 1966. King Hussein (center) sits with the university lecturers, Prime Minister Wasfi al-Tal and Sa'id Mufti, and the university president Nasir al-Din al-Asad (behind the podium) addresses the graduating students.

The University of Jordan's faculty has included scholars and public figures across several fields. Nasir al-Din al-Asad, a founding faculty member, served as the university's first president (1962–1968) and later as Jordan's minister of higher education. Abdelsalam al-Majali, a physician and former university president, later served twice as prime minister. Kamel Abu Jaber, professor of political science and former dean, was appointed foreign minister. Mohammad S. Obaidat, a professor at the King Abdullah II School of Information Technology, is an IEEE Life Fellow. Some sources report rankings placing him among leading scholars in telecommunications and cybersecurity.

In the sciences, Shaher Momani is known for work in fractional calculus. Jordanian press reported that he was "nominated" for the 2016 Nobel Prize in Physics, and he has appeared in lists of leading researchers in the field. Rankings place him among the global top 2% and identify him as a top-ranked Arab mathematician. The late Ali H. Nayfeh, who taught in mechanical engineering, was the inaugural winner of the Thomas K. Caughey Dynamics Award, and was awarded the Benjamin Franklin Medal in mechanical engineering.

In law, Kamel al-Saeed and George Hazboun taught on the faculty and contributed to the development of legal education at the university. Several academics also moved into public service: Khaled Toukan served as dean of engineering at the University of Jordan, later became minister of education. Walid al-Maani, an emeritus professor of neurosurgery, established the neurosurgery department at the medical school in the 1970s and later became the university's seventh president in 1998 after serving as dean and vice president.

The humanities at the University of Jordan have included writers and critics who taught and held leadership roles. Abdulkareem Khalefah taught from the early years, and served as the university's president (1968–1971), and later headed the Jordan Academy of Arabic. Ibrahim al-Samarrai, an Iraqi poet and scholar of classical literature, has taught in the Arabic department. In history, Abdul-Karim Gharaybeh wrote on Jordanian and Arab history. Hashem Yaghi produced studies of modern Arabic poetry and prose. Mahmoud al-Samra was a literary scholar and former minister of culture. He served as dean of arts (1968–1973) and published widely.

In English literature and translation, faculty have included Mohammad Shaheen (joined 1985), whose teaching and research in English and comparative literature extended over several decades. He is regarded as one of the pioneers of literary studies in Jordan. Also Rula Quawas, professor of American literature who introduced courses on feminist theory and founded the Women's Studies Center in 2006. Albert Jamil Butros, department chair in the 1960s and 1970s who later served as Jordan's ambassador to the United Kingdom and published on Middle English, including Chaucer. And Mohammad Asfour, a professor of Arabic–English translation. Quawas received Princess Basma's Award for Leadership in women's empowerment and was nominated for the U.S. State Department's International Women of Courage Award in 2013.

=== Prominent alumni ===
Notable alumni of the University of Jordan have made contributions across politics, science, business, literature, journalism, and academia. Several graduates have held high political positions, such as the former Jordanian prime ministers Bisher Khasawneh, Marouf al-Bakhit, and Fayez al-Tarawneh, also Rami Hamdallah, who became prime minister of the Palestinian Authority after serving as president of the university. Beyond the premiership, the university's alumni have held cabinet and senior public posts. Maha Ali earned a B.Sc. in industrial engineering at UJ and later served as minister of industry and trade. The late Eid Dahiyat (B.A. English, 1967) served as minister of education and led several universities. Compilations of alumni note that more than 100 have served as ministers in the region (excluding prime ministers), more than 60 have served in the House of Representatives or the Senate in Jordan, more than 10 have served as ambassadors, and more than 15 as bank directors, and 14 as chief executives outside the banking sector. The university was attended by the eldest daughter of King Hussein bin Talal, Her Royal Highness Princess Alia bint Hussein, and Sharifa Nofa bint Nasser. Both of them are members of the royal family in Jordan.

Notable University of Jordan alumni and affiliates in government posts. For example: Khaled al-Karaki (former chief of the Royal Court and minister of culture; former UJ president) studied at the university. Also, Wajih Owais (former minister of higher education; former JUST president), Hala Zawati (former energy minister), Firas al-Hawari (former health minister), Bassam Talhouni (former justice minister), Adel al-Twaisi (former higher-education minister; former UJ president), Jumana Ghunaimat (former minister of state for information affairs; ambassador to Morocco), Amer al-Fayez (president and chairman at Al-Abdali Investment & Development PSC), and Fayez al-Dwairi (retired general and strategic analyst).

Some alumni and attendees have held senior roles in diplomacy. John Abizaid, a retired U.S. Army four-star general and later U.S. ambassador to Saudi Arabia, studied Arabic at UJ as an Olmsted Scholar. Jeffrey D. Feltman, a U.S. diplomat who became ambassador to Lebanon and a UN under-secretary-general, spent a year at UJ studying Arabic. Ahmet Davutoğlu, Turkey's prime minister from 2014 to 2016, studied Arabic at UJ. Hoshyar Zebari, Iraq's foreign minister for more than a decade, earned a B.A. in political science from UJ in 1976.

In science and academia, alumni like Lubna Tahtamouni have earned recognition as researchers. She is a biologist known for her cancer research. Tahtamouni was named among the BBC's "100 Women" for her advocacy of women in STEM careers. Yousef Al-Abed is a chemist and professor at Feinstein Institutes for Medical Research, and Jalil Tarif an economist who serves as the Secretary General of the Arab Union for Securities Commissions.

Alumni work in arts, literature, and media. Habib al-Zyoudi earned a B.A. in Arabic literature at the University of Jordan in 1987. His poetry draws on patriotic and folkloric themes. Musa Hawamdeh graduated from the Faculty of Arts in 1982 and later published free-verse collections. In research and advocacy, Ramy Abdu received an MBA from UJ before completing a doctorate abroad and founded the Euro-Mediterranean Human Rights Monitor, and Ayman Otoom completed postgraduate study in Arabic at the university. He is a prominent poet and novelist in Middle East. Najeeb al-Shorbaji, who served at the World Health Organization in Geneva, leads Jordan's eHealth Development Association and has worked on knowledge-management initiatives. Among women writers and activists, Zulaikha Abu Risha earned B.A. (1966) and M.A. (1989) degrees in Arabic literature at UJ and has published poetry and criticism, especially women's rights. Among contemporary writers, Nourah Al Saad has published essays and literary criticism.

In the entertainment and sport, Lara Elayyan is a Palestinian-Jordanian singer who studied at UJ. Tima Shomali, who earned a B.Sc. in Business Administration (Finance) before moving into film and comedy and creating the Netflix series "AlRawabi School for Girls". Alaa Wardi, who studied music and sound engineering at UJ and, after graduating in 2008, built an a cappella and YouTube career. And taekwondo athlete Ahmad Abughaush, a Sports Science student when he won Olympic gold at the 2016 Rio Games, after which UJ awarded him a full scholarship.

In journalism and media across the Arab region, Wadah Khanfar earned an engineering degree in 1990 and later served as director general of Al Jazeera (2003–2011); Fast Company listed him among its global thinkers. Ehab Al Shihabi completed a B.A. and an MBA at UJ and later became executive director for international operations at Al Jazeera Media Network. In religious media, Mohammad Qudah completed B.A., M.A., and Ph.D. degrees in Islamic jurisprudence at UJ and later hosted programs on Yaqeen FM while serving in government. The late Nahed Hattar, who earned a sociology degree in 1982, worked as a columnist and political writer until his assassination in 2016.

In international organizations and public service. Sima Sami Bahous earned a B.A. in English literature at UJ and in 2021 was appointed executive director of UN Women. Malik R. Dahlan received an LL.B. from UJ, and works as an international lawyer and mediator, and is professor of international law and public policy (emeritus) at Queen Mary University of London. In public administration, Afroz Ahmad, an Indian civil servant, has also held senior roles.

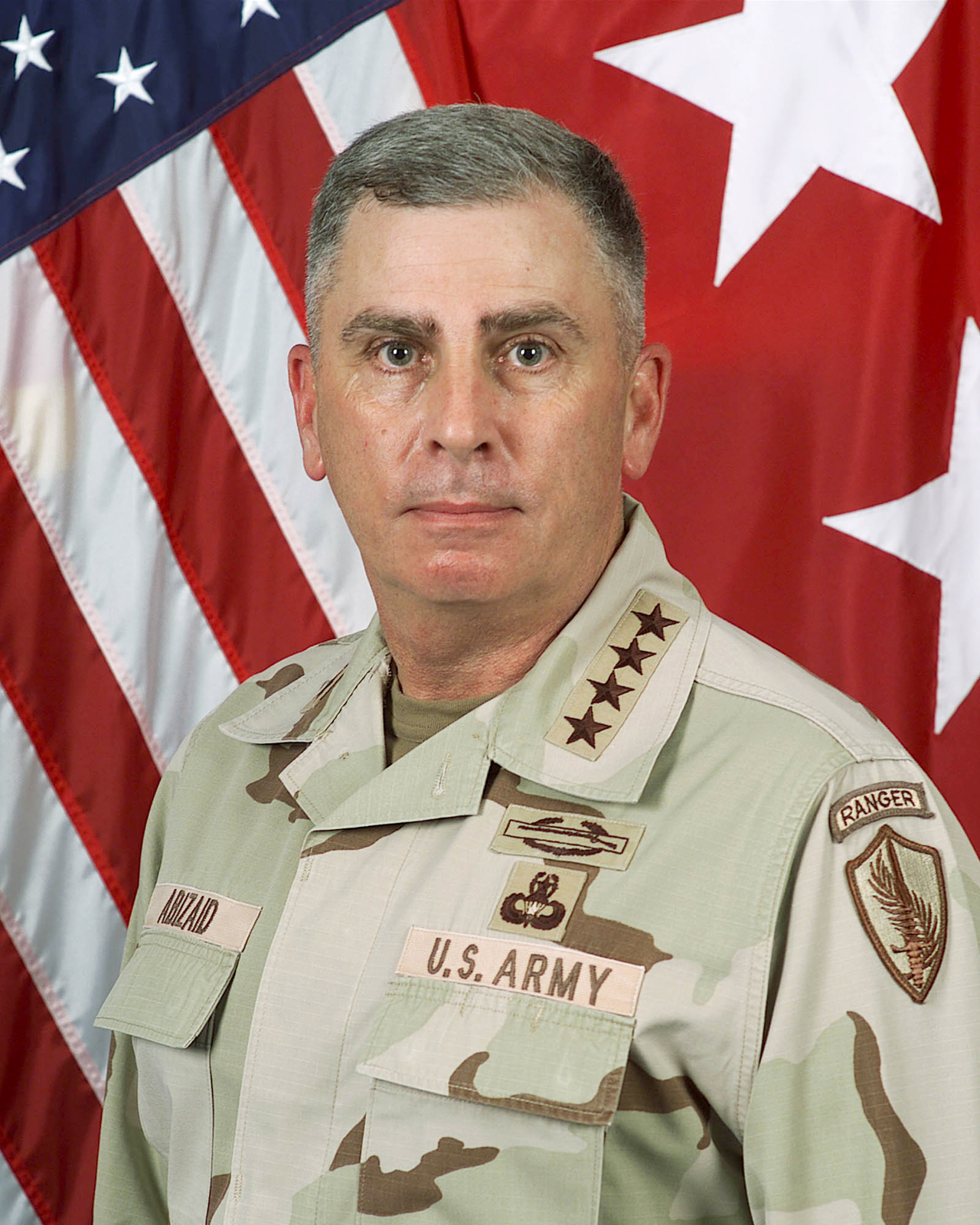
U.S. Army general and U.S. ambassador to Saudi Arabia John Abizaid; studied Arabic 1978–1980

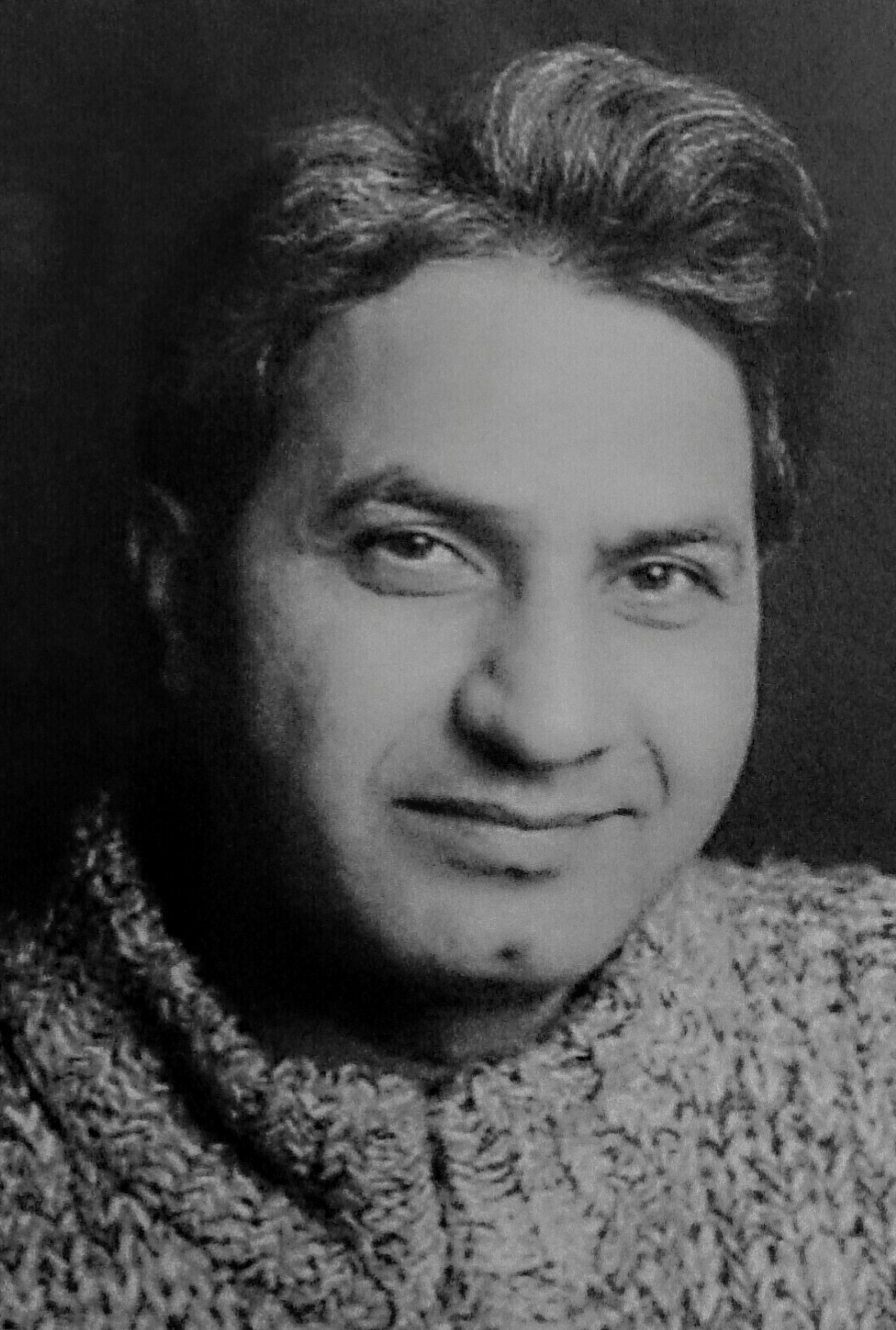
Indian civil servant Afroz Ahmad

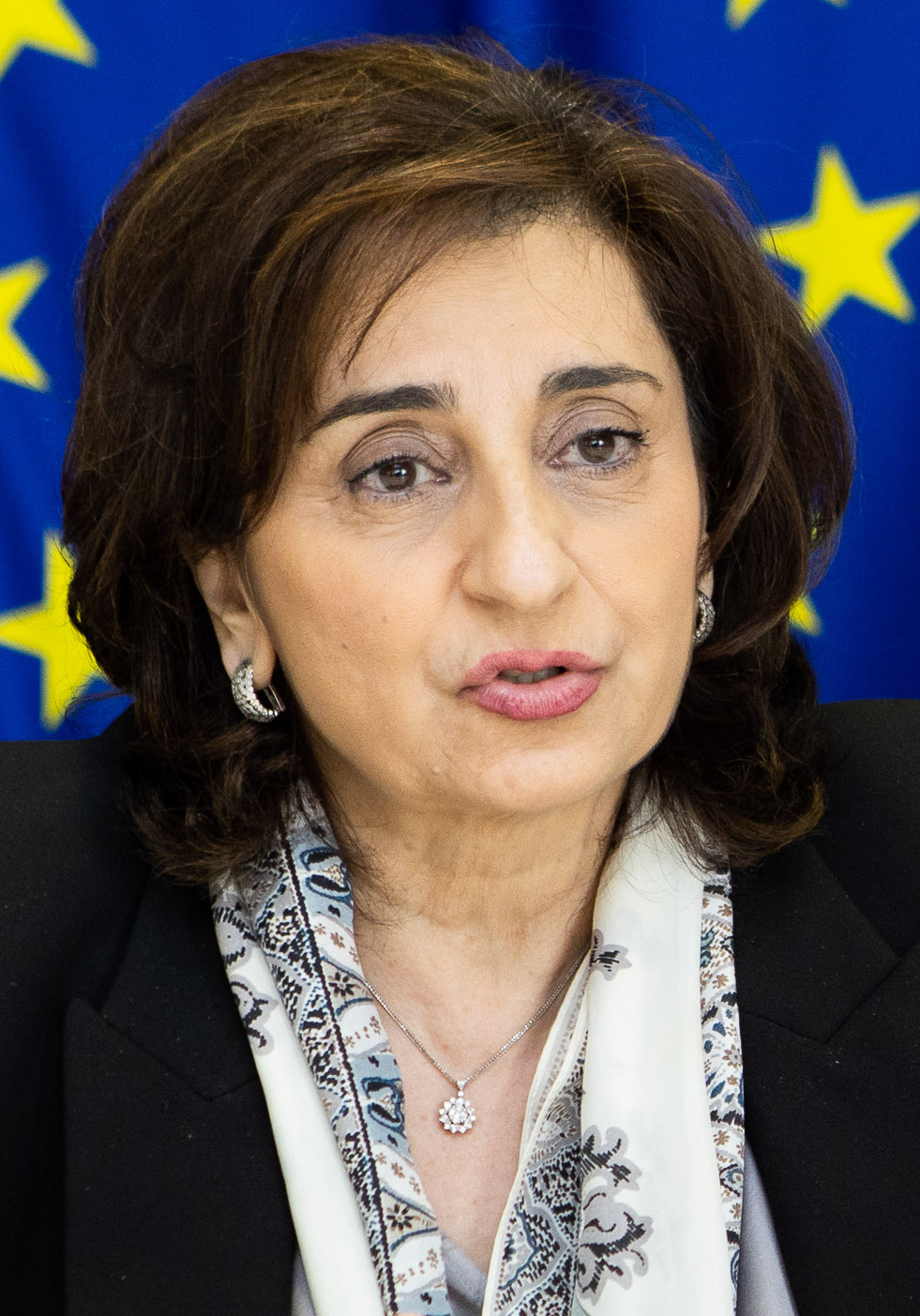
UN Women Executive Director Sima Sami Bahous; B.A. in English literature 1977

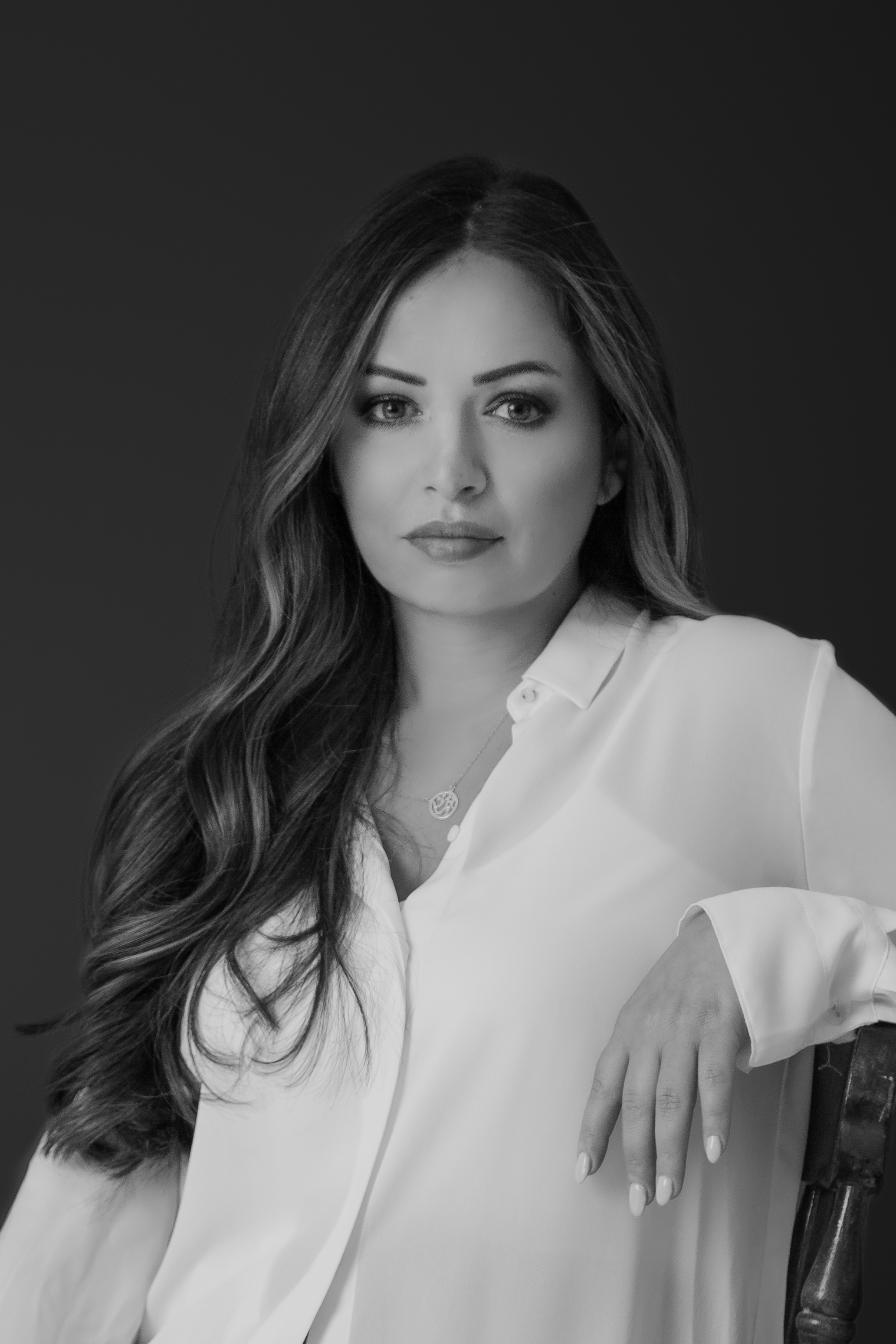
Tima Shomali; B.Sc. in Business Administration 2008

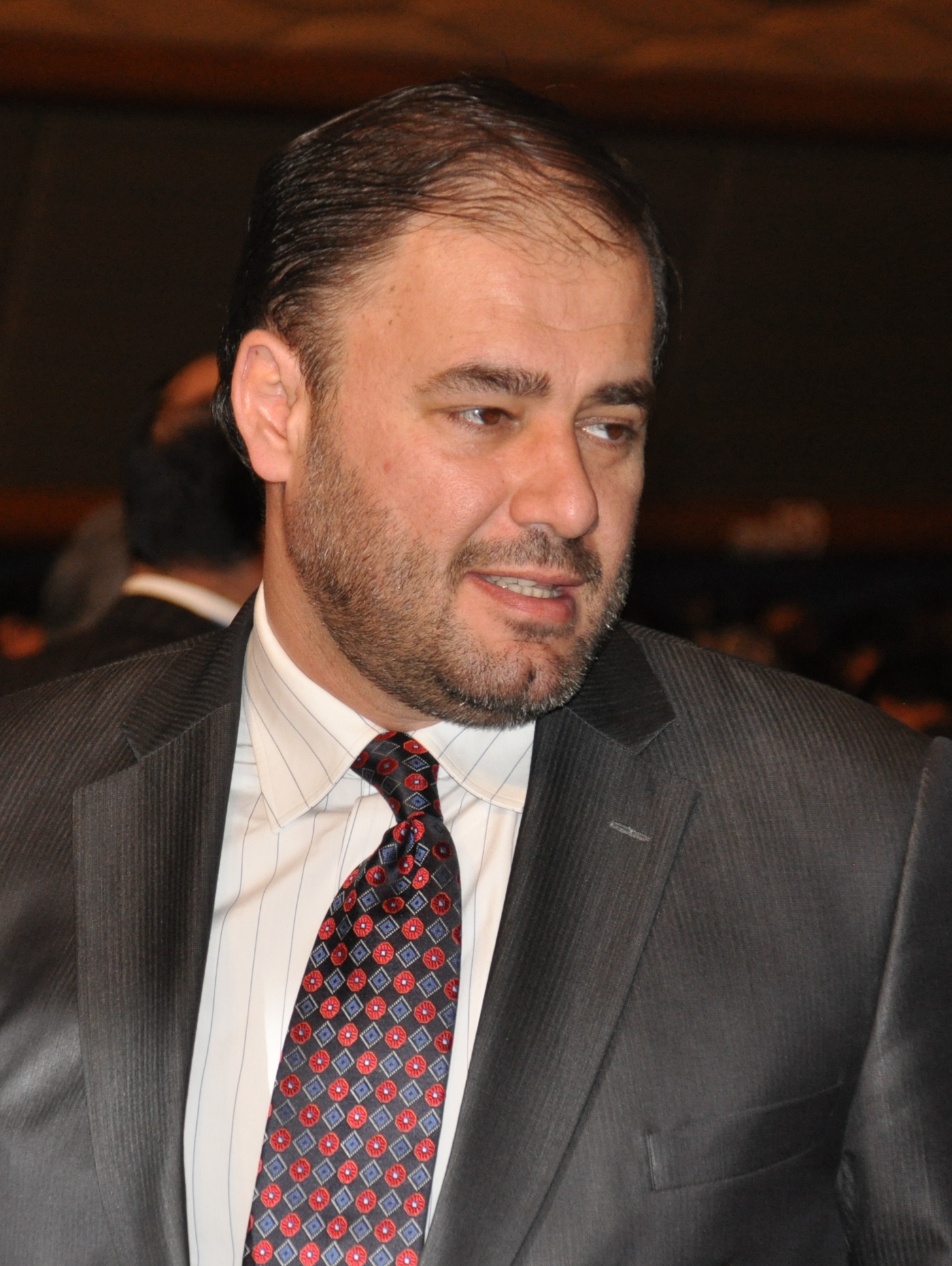
Al Jazeera director-general Wadah Khanfar; engineering degree 1990

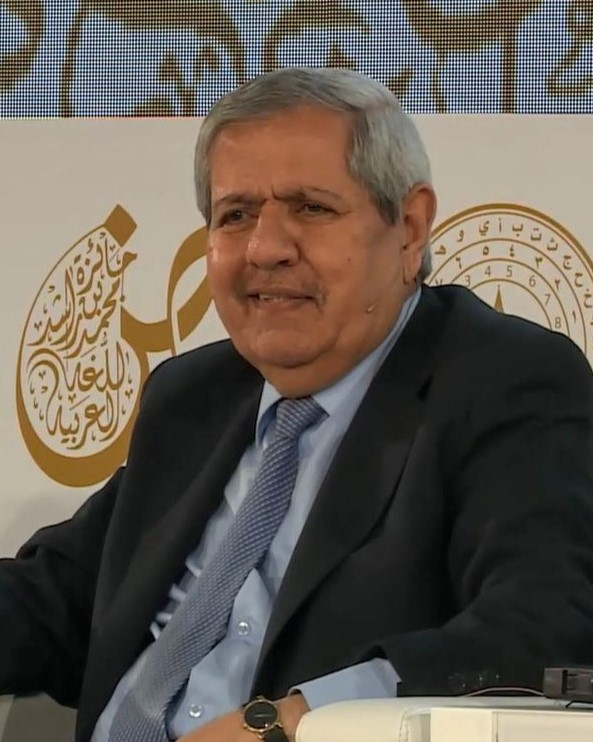
Poet and statesman Khaled al-Karaki; Royal Court chief (BA 1969)

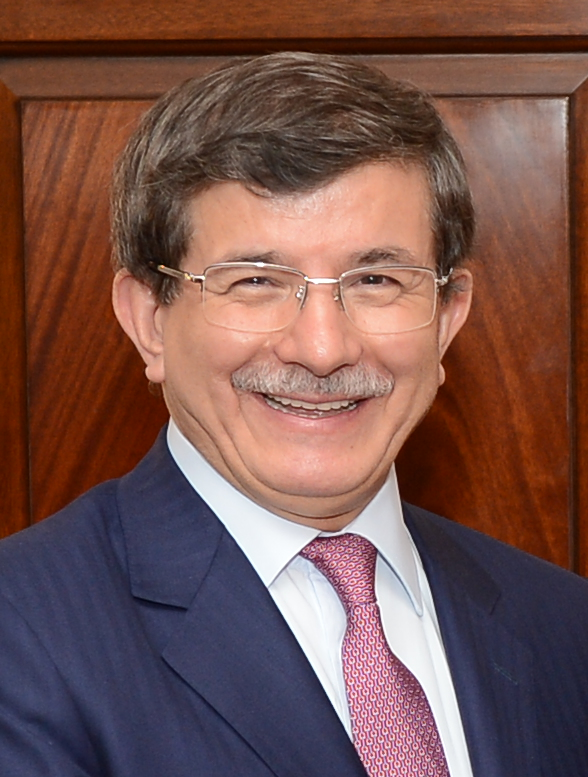
Former Prime Minister of Turkey Ahmet Davutoğlu; studied Arabic 1988–1989

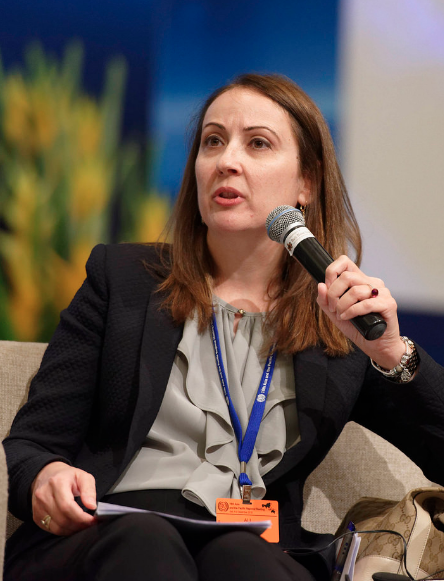
Minister of Industry and Trade Maha Ali; B.Sc. in Industrial Engineering

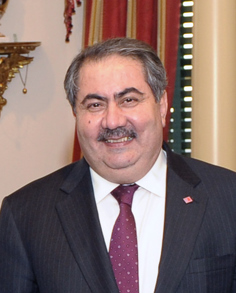
Iraq's foreign minister Hoshyar Zebari; B.A. in Political Science 1976

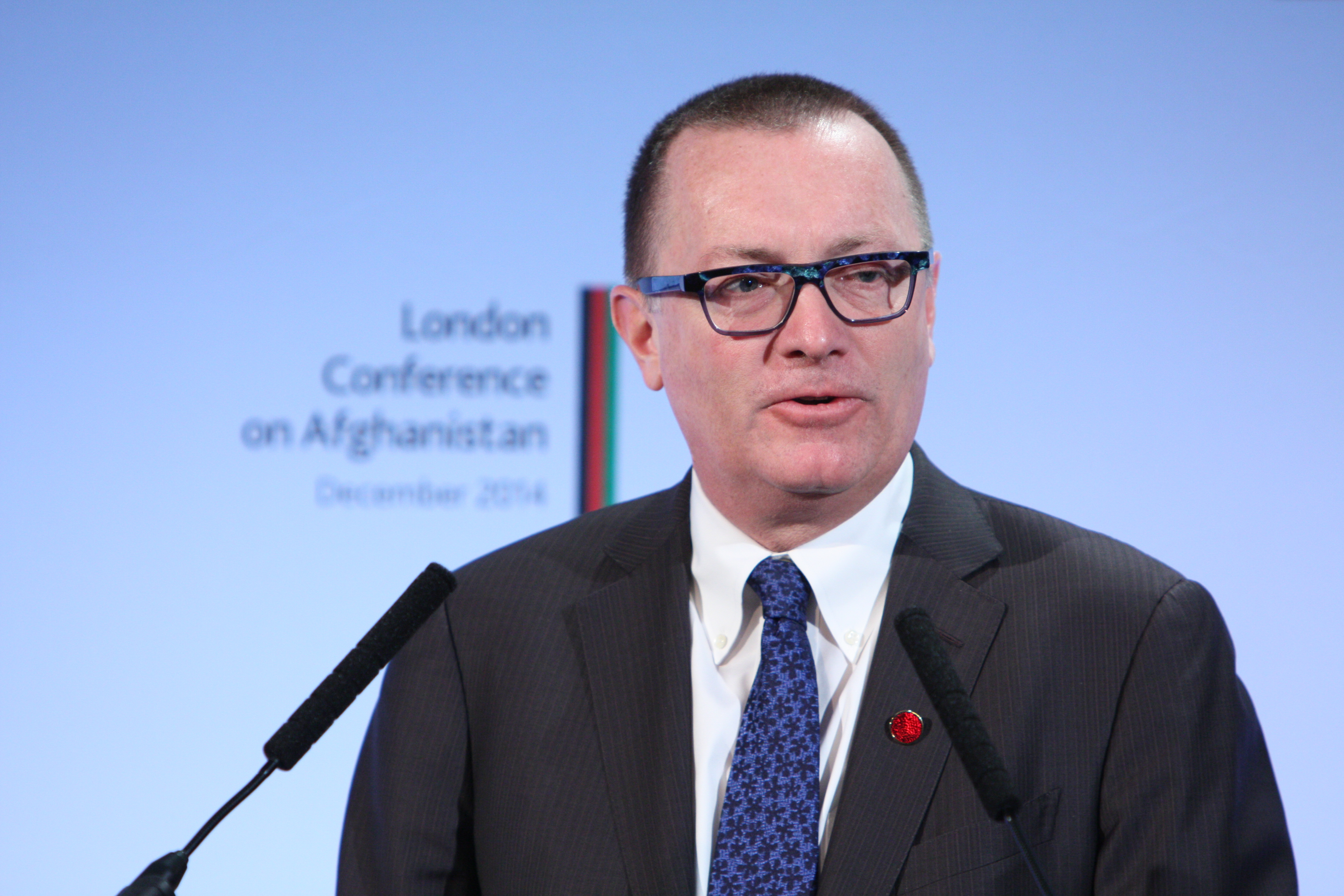
U.S. diplomat Jeffrey D. Feltman; UN Under-Secretary-General; studied Arabic 1994–1995

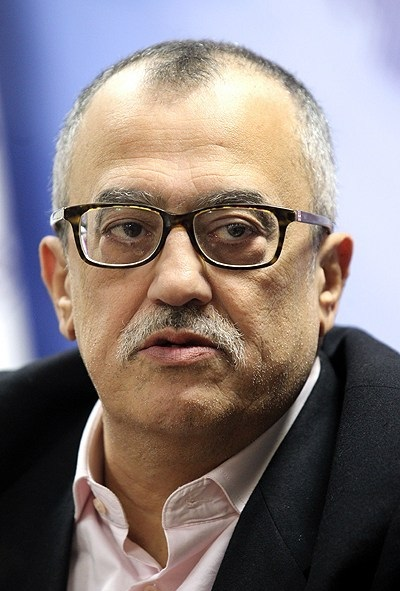
Writer and columnist Nahed Hattar; B.A. in Sociology 1982

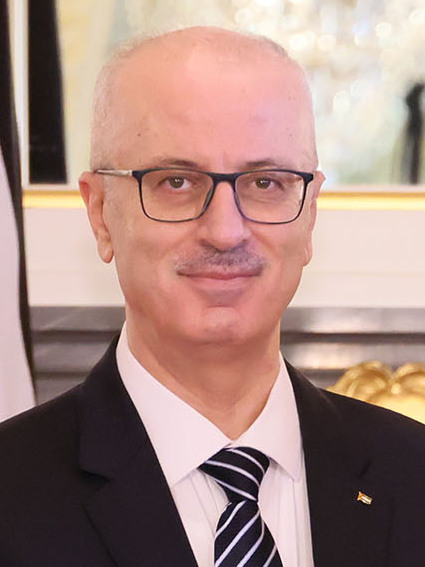
Former Prime Minister of Palestine Rami Hamdallah; BA 1980

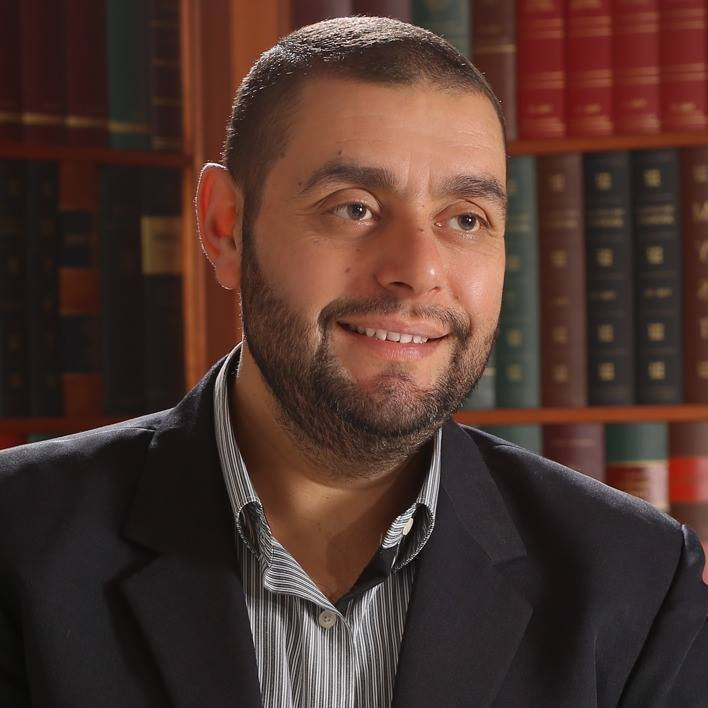
Poet and novelist Ayman Otoom; PhD in Arabic Literature 2007

== Gallery ==
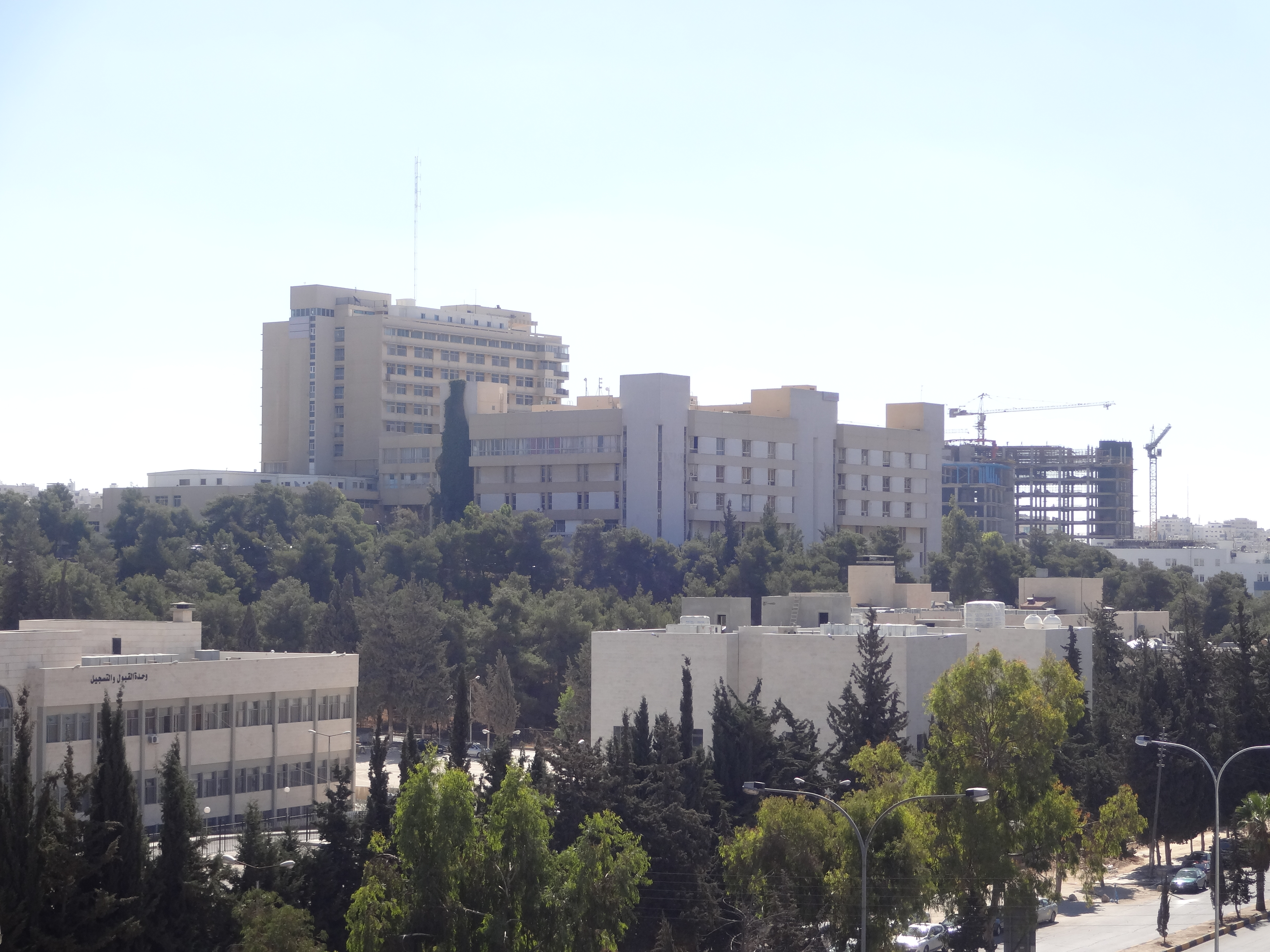
Jordan University Hospital

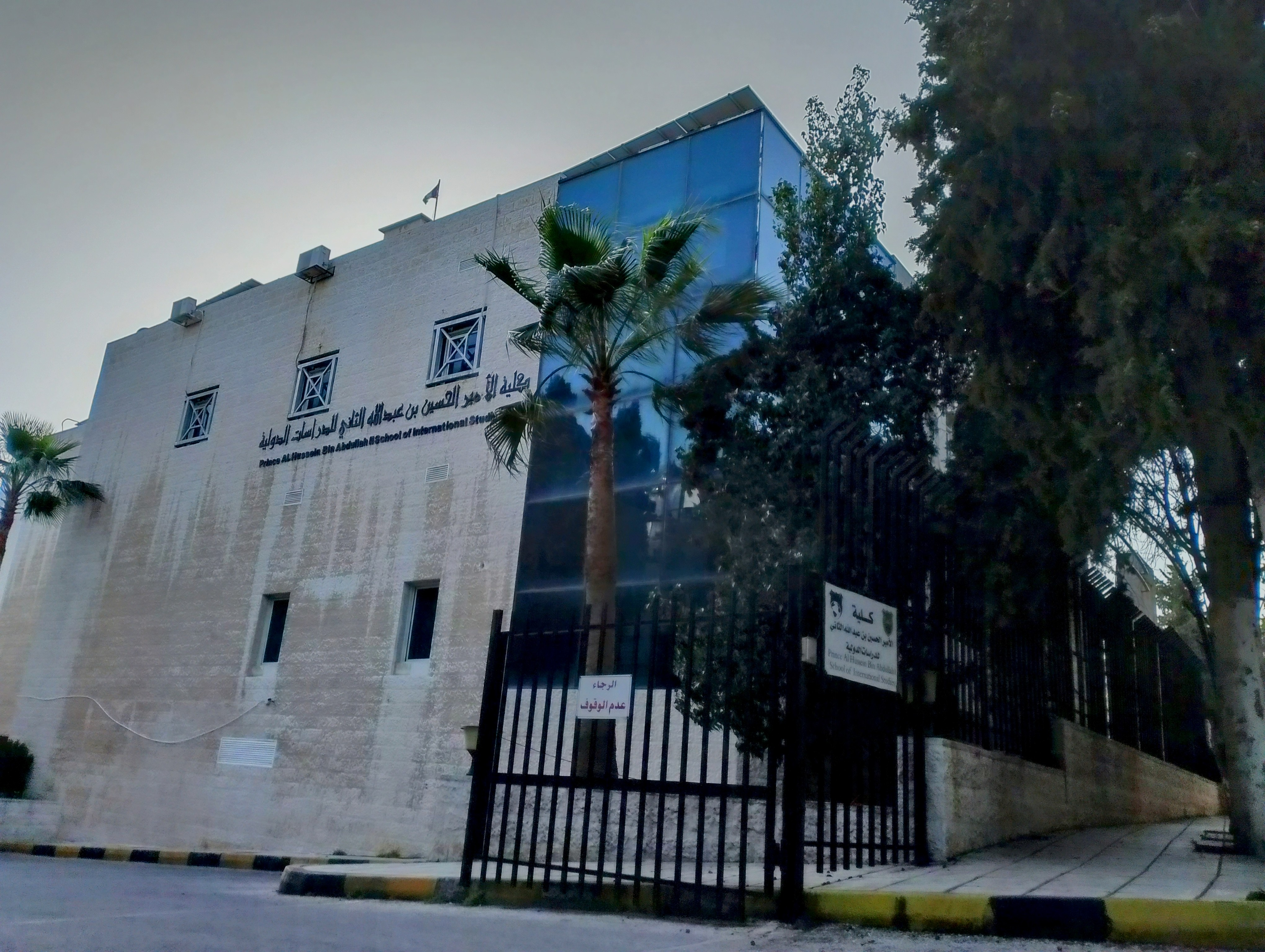
Prince Al Hussein Bin Abdullah II School

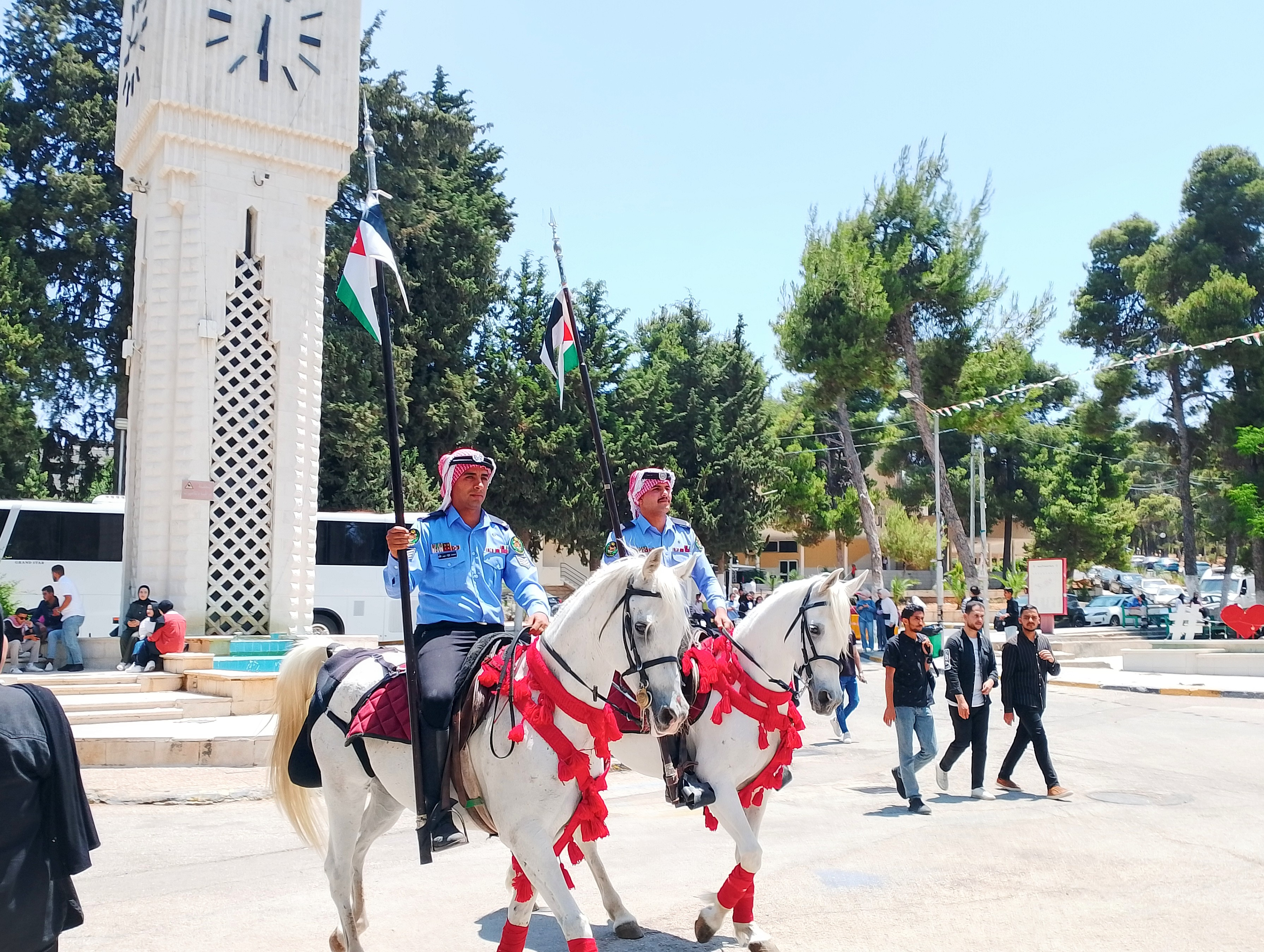
Cavalry Unit in front of the Clock Tower

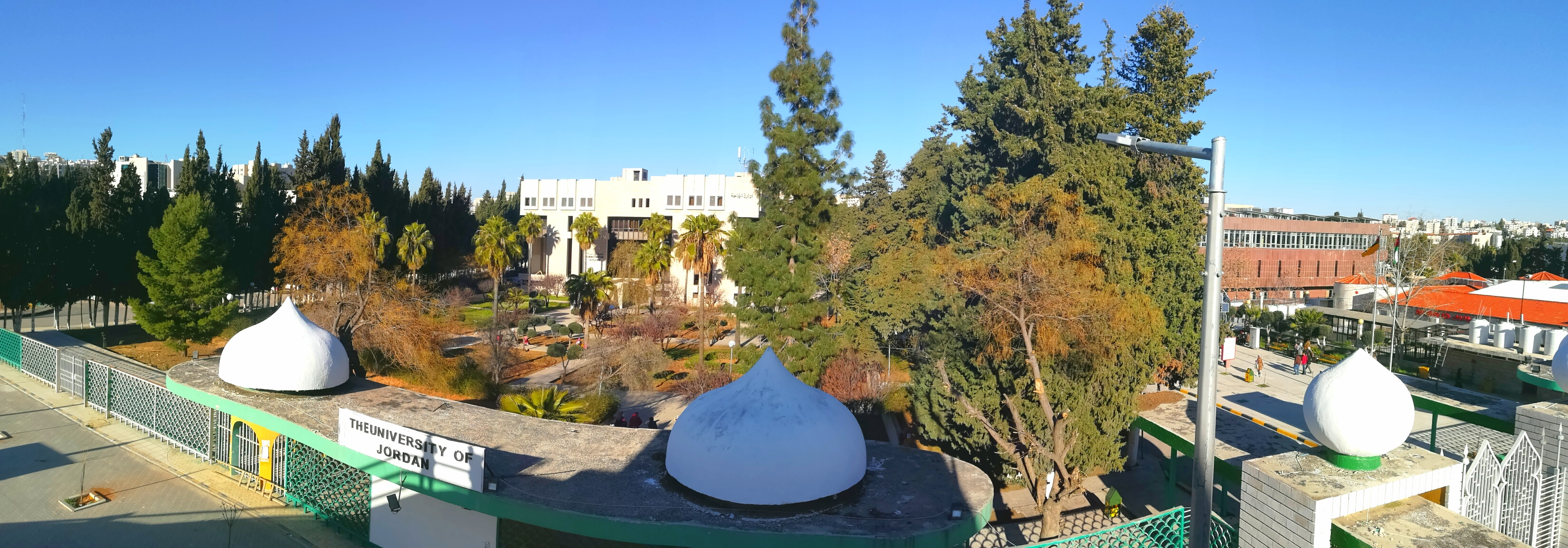
Main gate

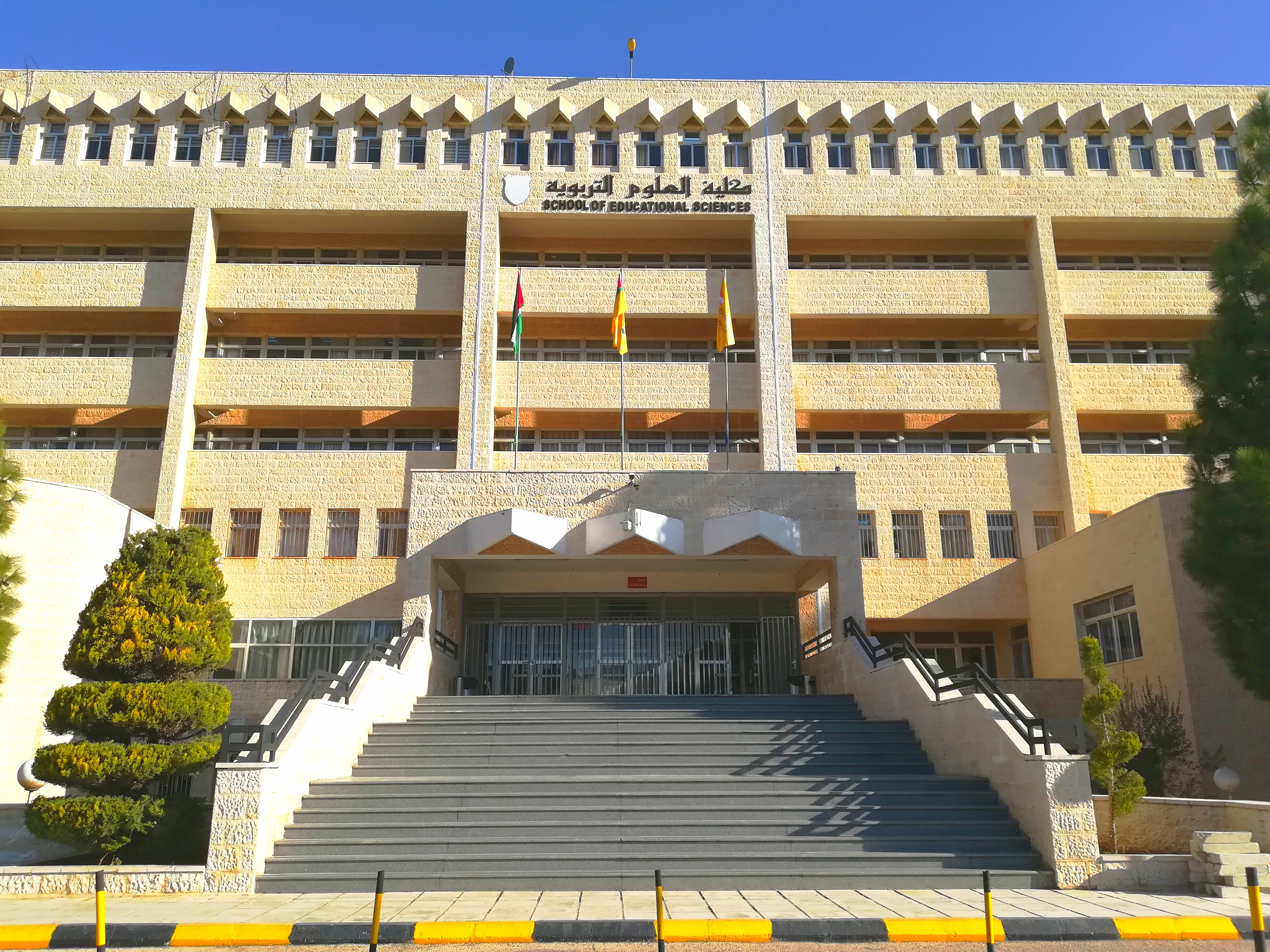
School of Educational Sciences

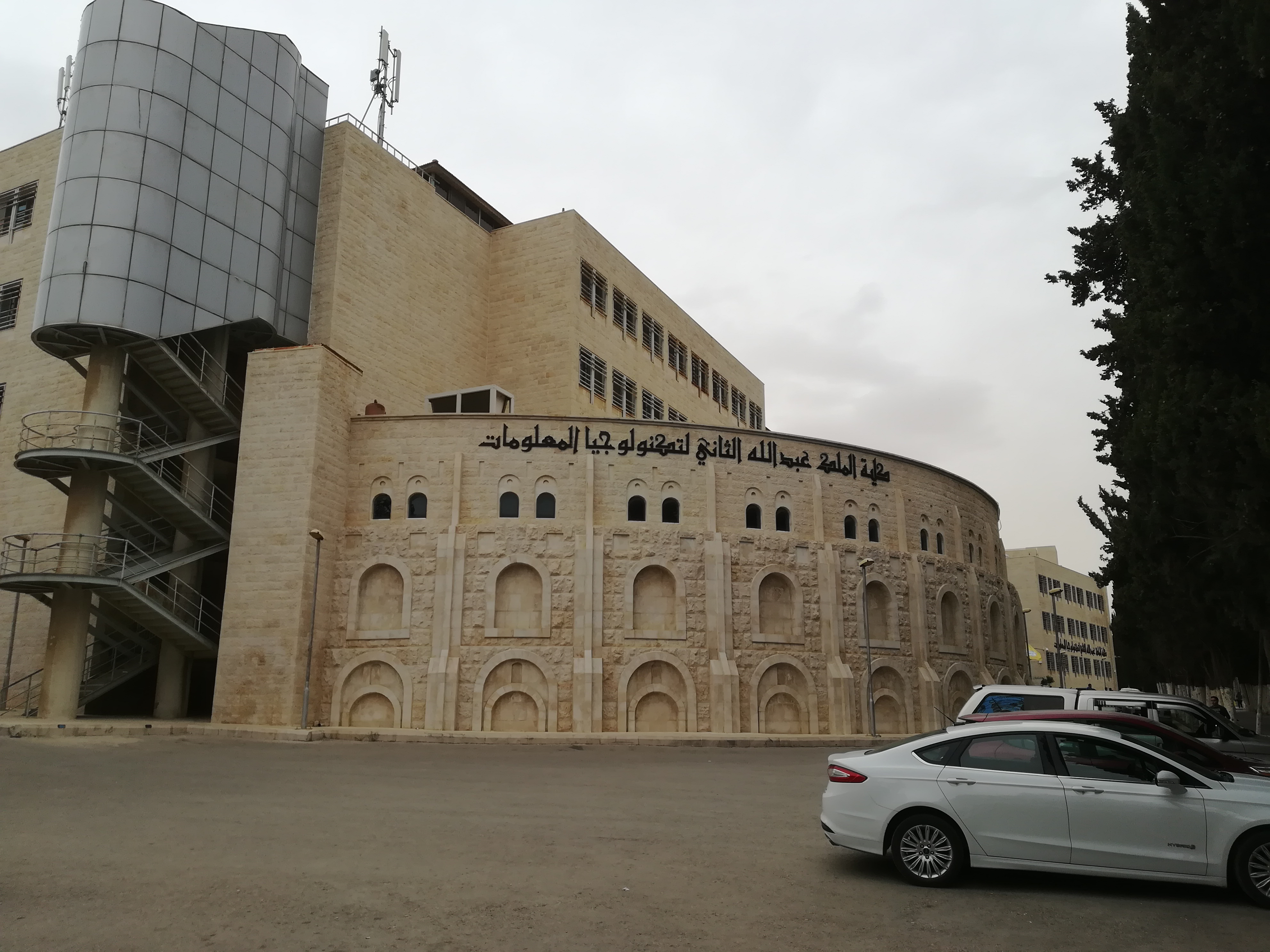
King Abdullah II School of Information Technology

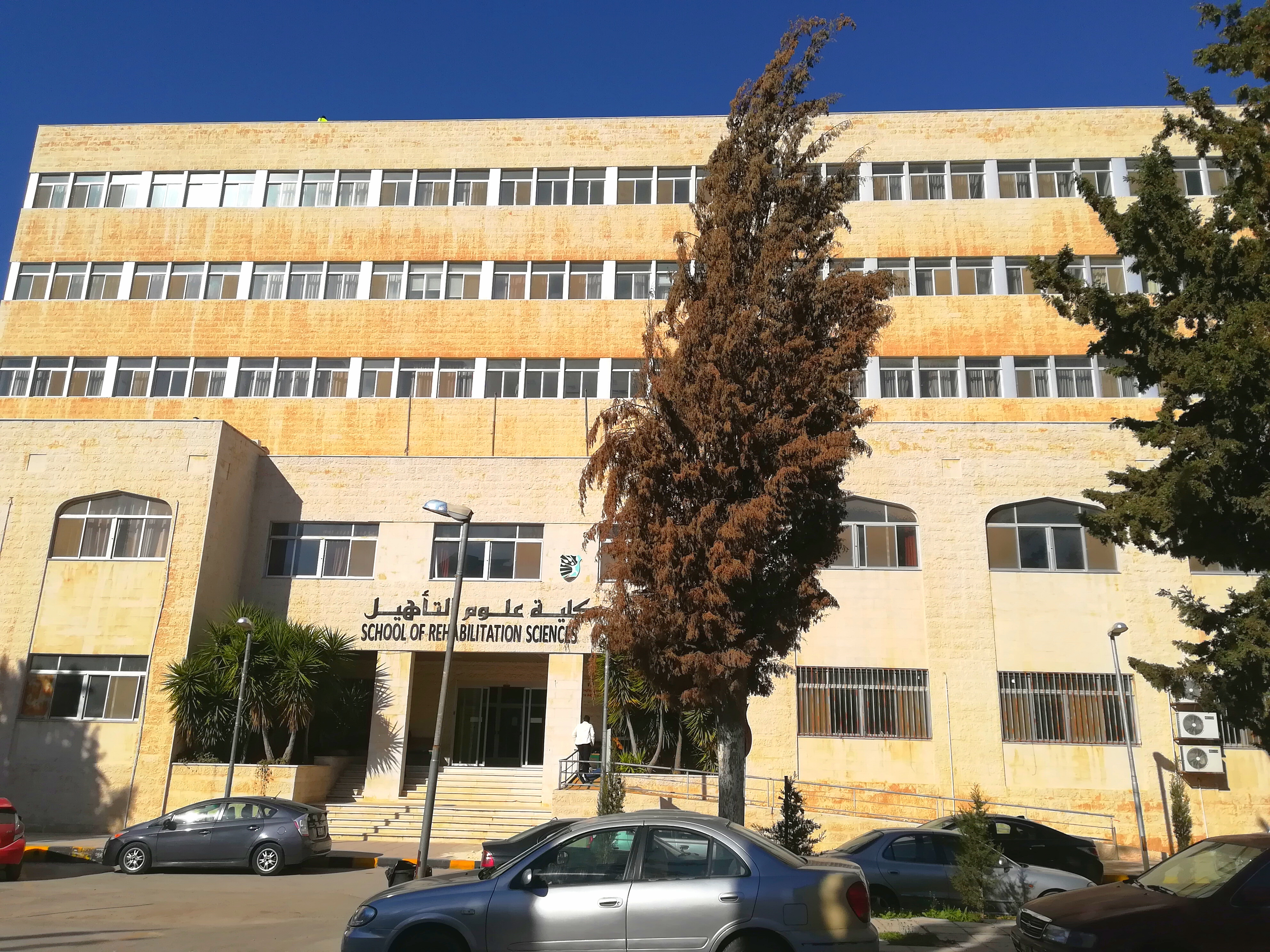
School of Rehabilitation Sciences

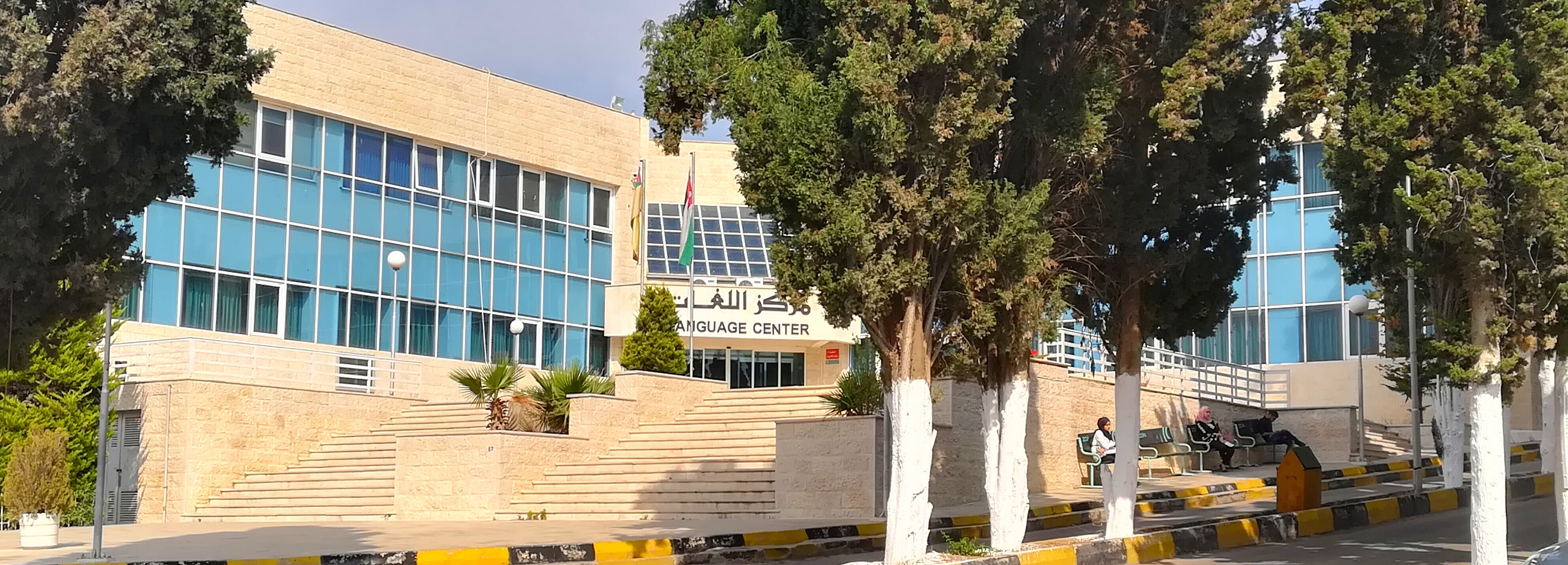
Language Center

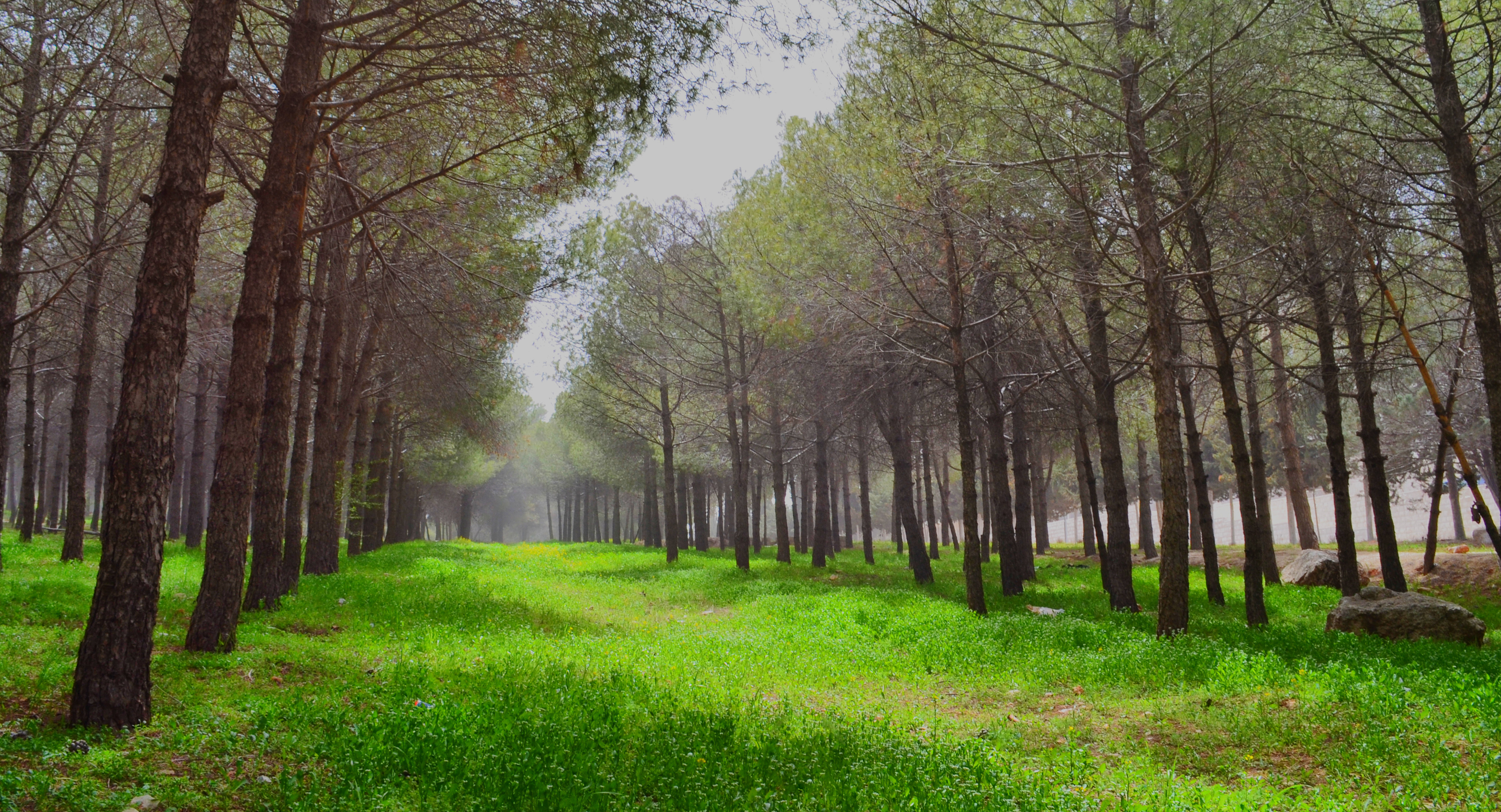
Trees on the south side of the university

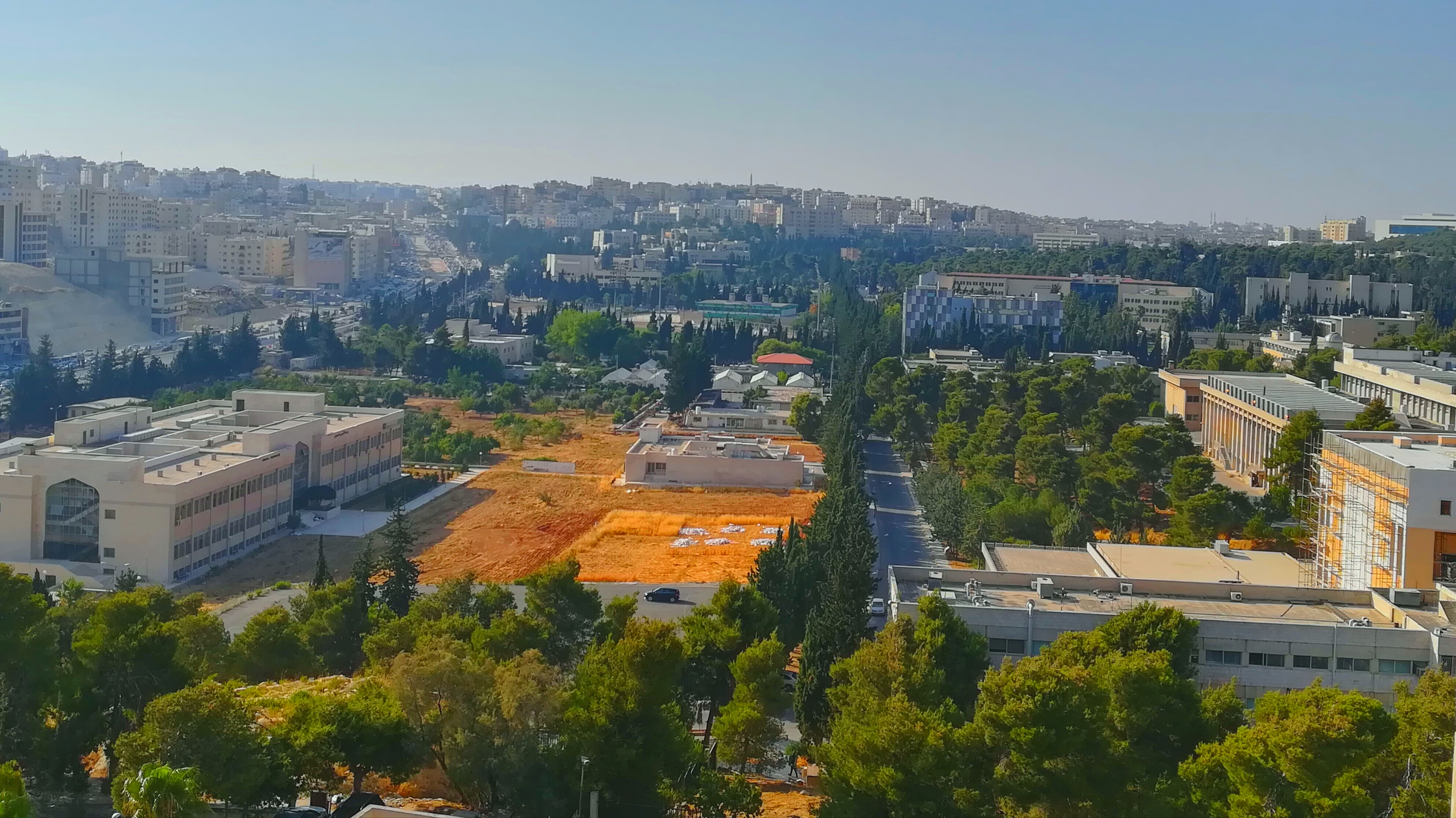
Panoramic view of the south side of the University

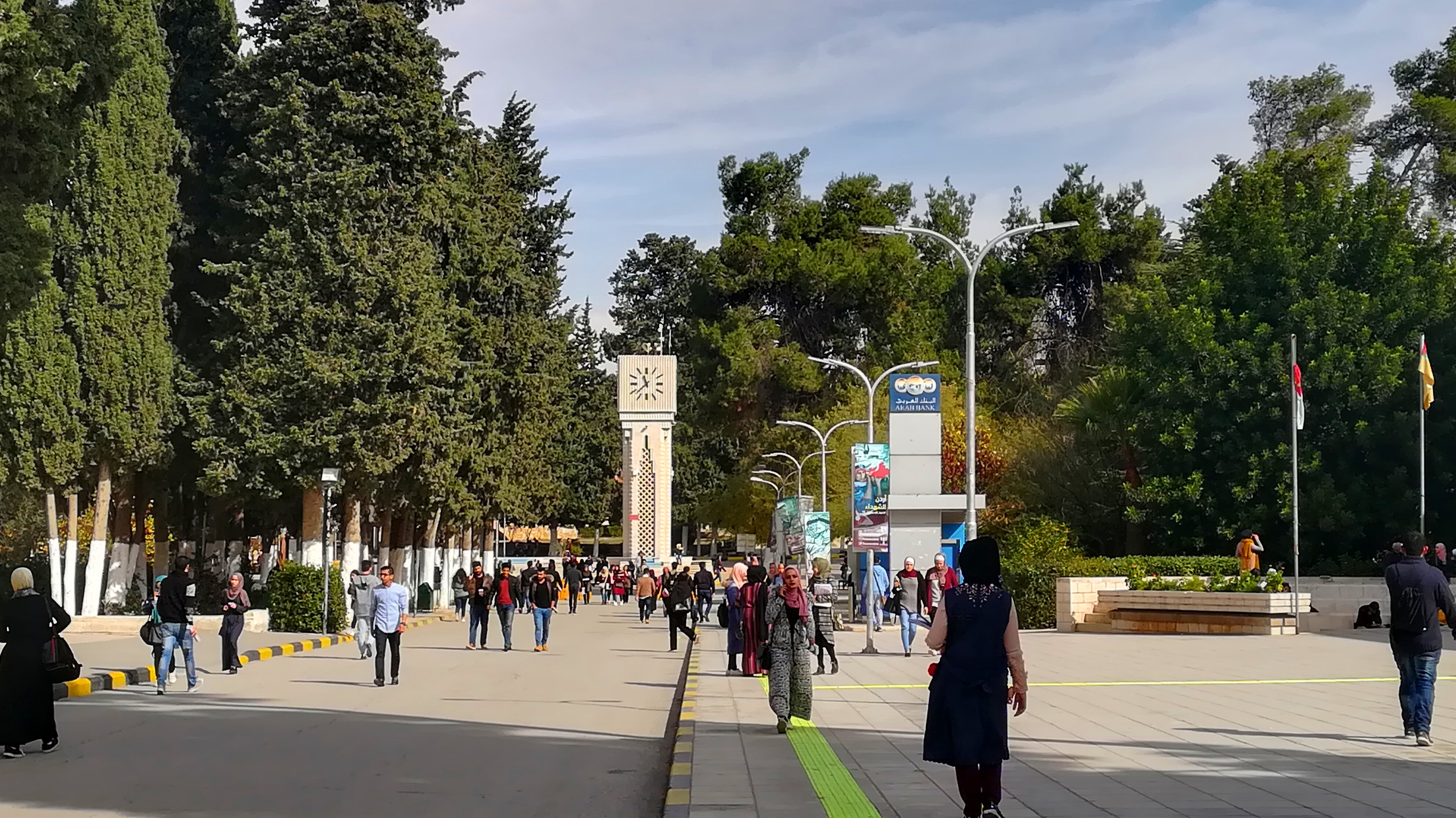
Clock Tower

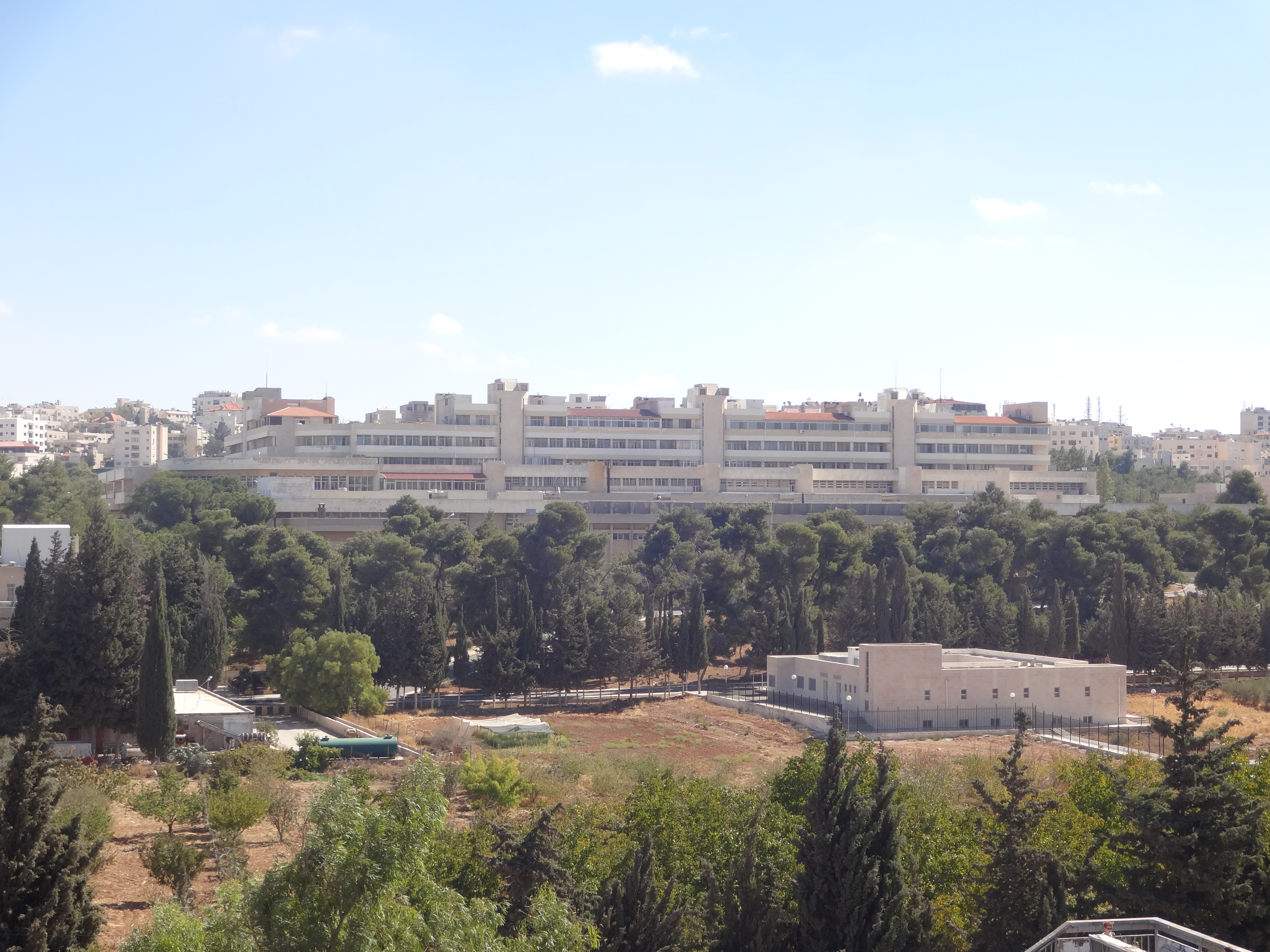
School of Engineering

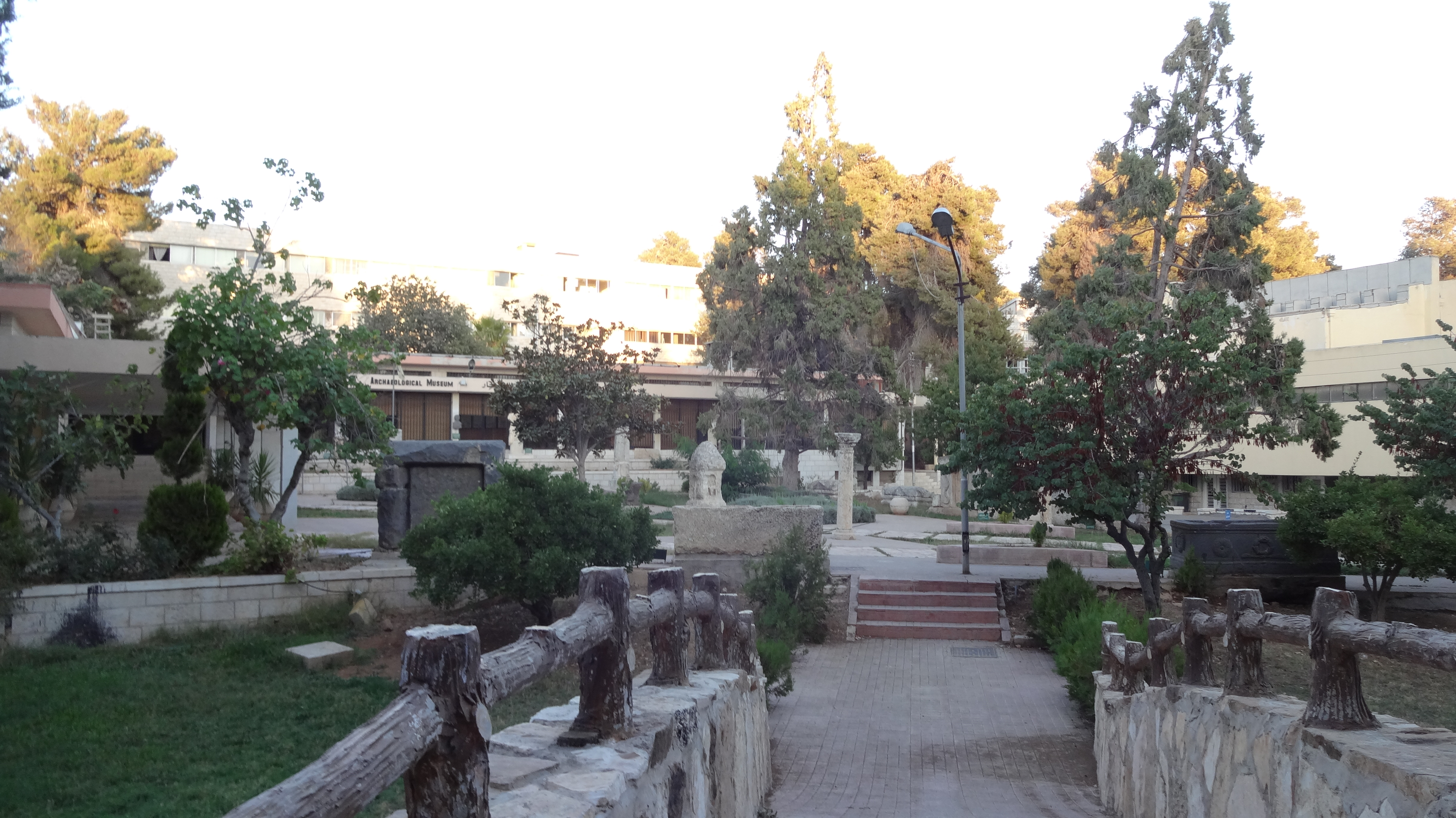
Archaeological Museum

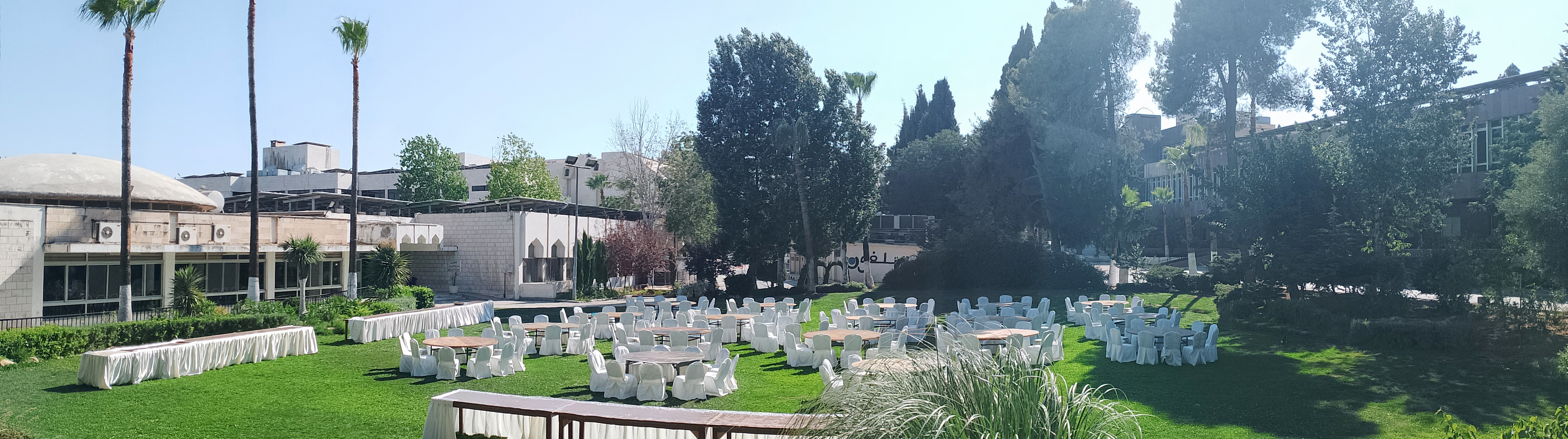
Green Lawn at the University

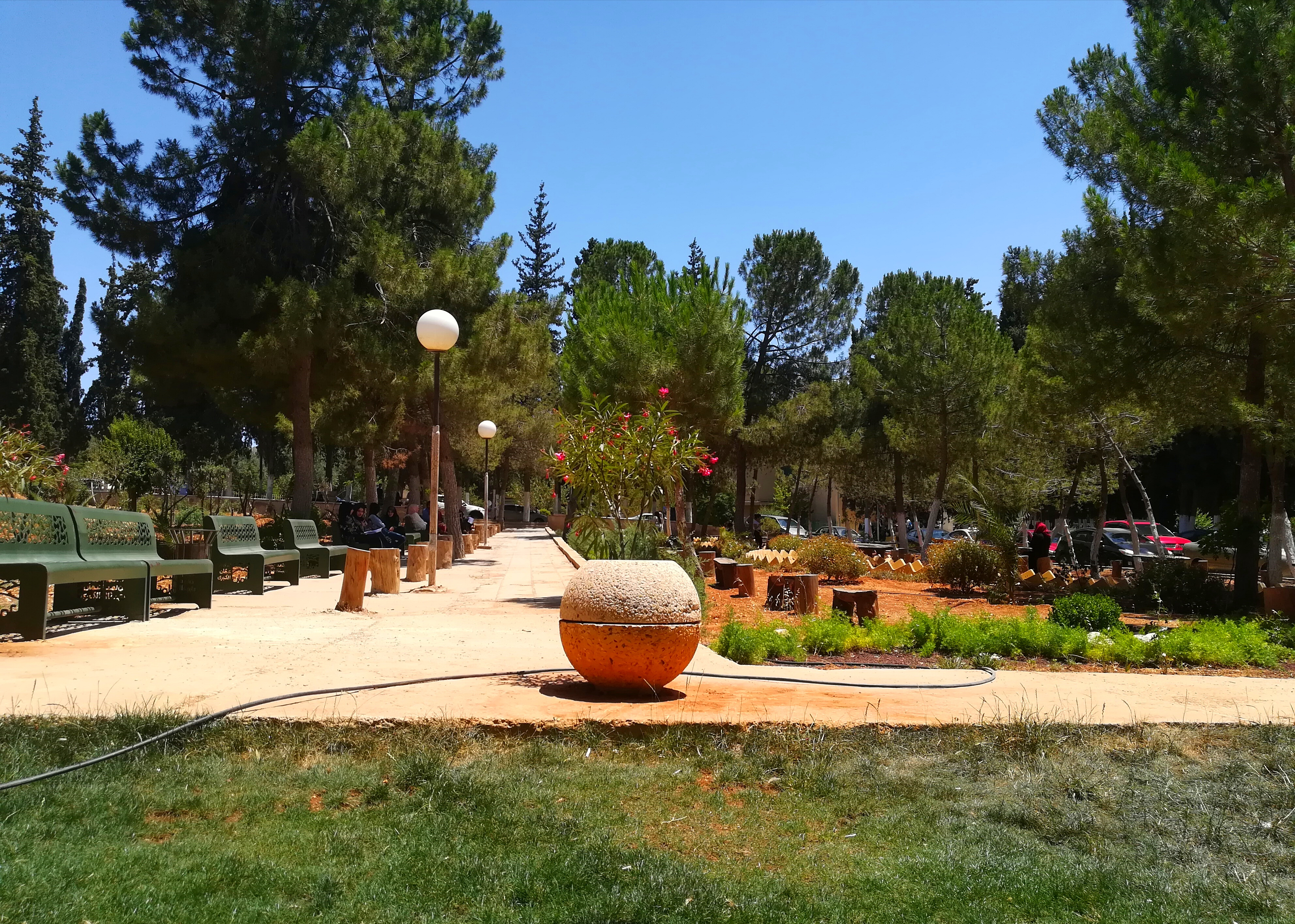
Foreign Languages Garden

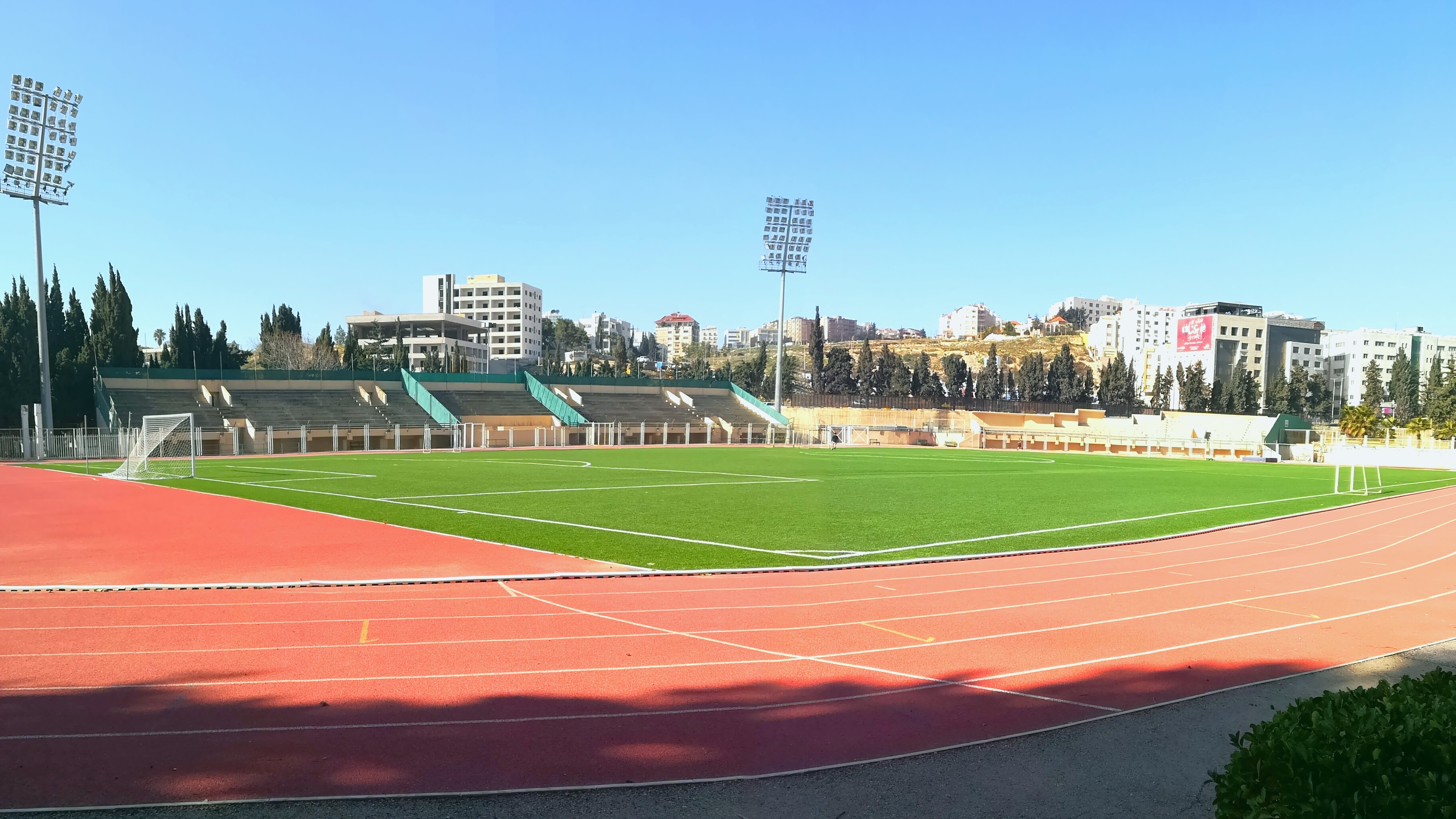
University Stadium

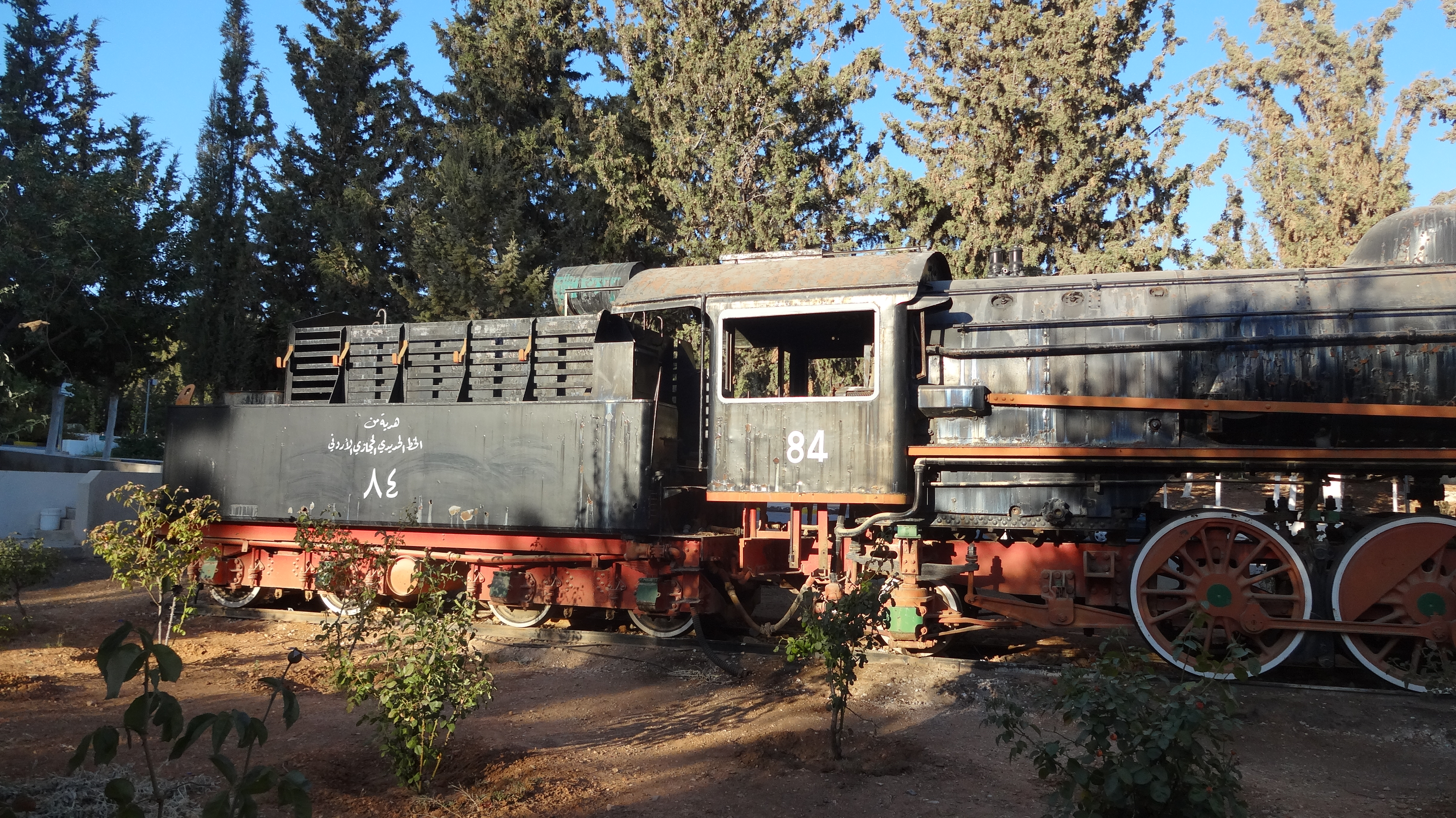
A Hejaz Railway passenger coach on the university campus

== See also ==
- List of Islamic educational institutions
- List of universities in Jordan
