= 2018 in Iraq =

- Decades: 1990s; 2000s; 2010s; 2020s
- See also: Other events of 2018; List of years in Iraq

Events in the year 2018 in Iraq.

== Incumbents ==
- Presidents:
  Fuad Masum (until 2 October)
  Barham Salih (since 2 October)
- Prime Minister: Haider al-Abadi, Adil Abdul-Mahdi
- Vice President: Nouri al-Maliki, Usama al-Nujayfi, Ayad Allawi

== Events ==
- 15 January – Iraq's Ministry of Health reported that 27 people were killed and 64 injured by a double suicide bombing in central Baghdad. Although there were no immediate claims of responsibility, it was reported that such attacks had usually been the work of Islamic State in the past, and that elements of the group were still active north of the city despite the government's claim of victory in December 2017. Two days later (on Wednesday January 17, 2018) Islamic State "claimed responsibility for the twin suicide bombings in Baghdad this week", though the New York Times suggested that the delay, and a number of errors in the claim, may show that the group's "media apparatus has been disrupted".
- 12 April – 2018 Asdira funeral bombing killed 25 people and wounded 18 others. The attack took place at a funeral for Iraqi fighters who had been killed by IS.
- 14 July – Internet service was cut off in Baghdad, Najaf and Basra following anti-government protests in several cities.
- 16 August – 27 September – deaths of the "Thursday victims", Rafif al-Yasiri (plastic surgeon 16 August), Rasha al-Hassan (beautician 23 August), Suʽad al-ʽAli (activist 25 September), and Tara Fares (model 27 September), prominent women to die under uncertain circumstances. Their deaths were linked together by acting Prime minister Haider al-Abadi, despite little connection between the victims.

== Deaths ==
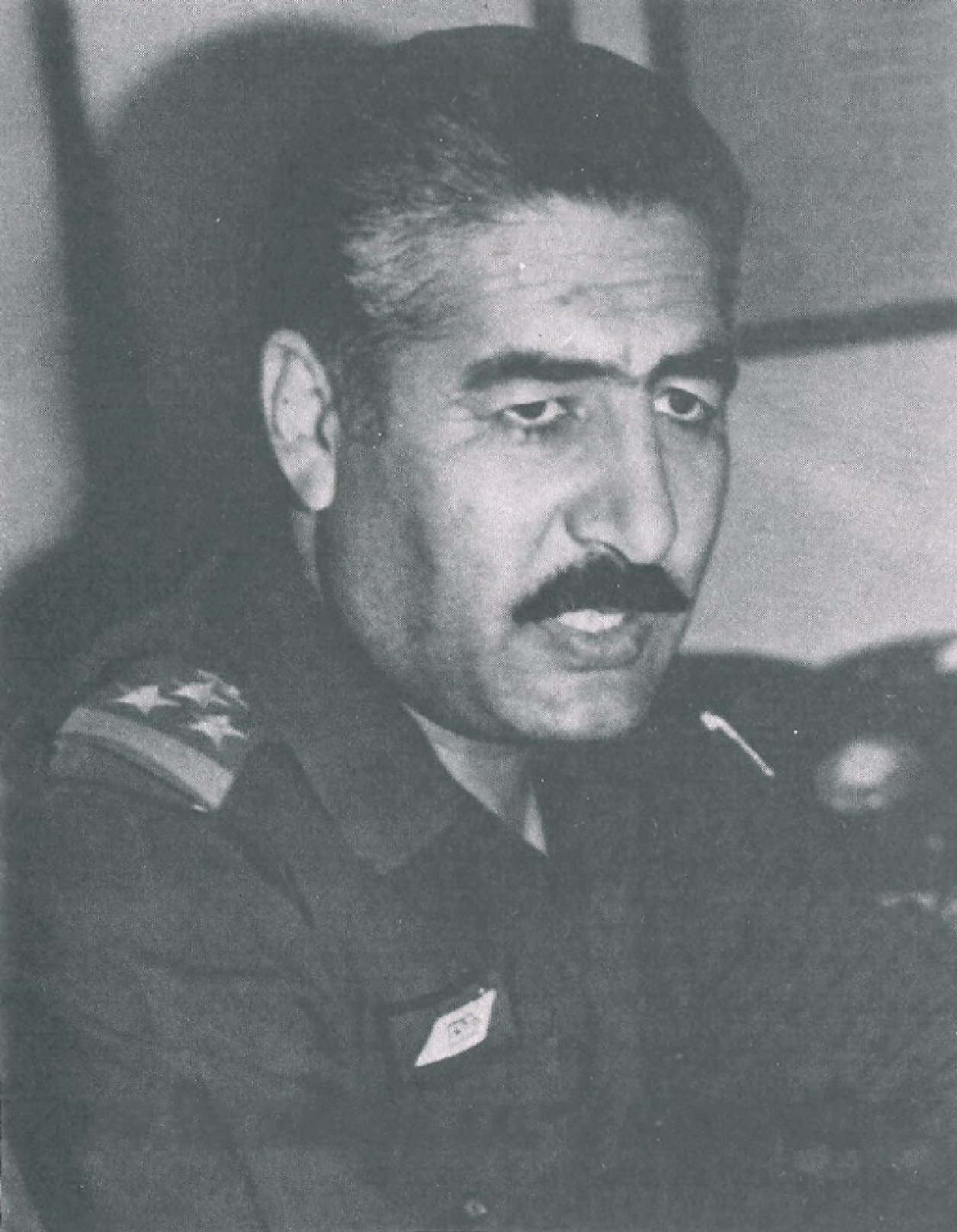
Iyad Futayyih

- 2 January – Ali Kadhim, footballer (b.1949).
- 12 February – Kamal al-Hadithi, poet (b.1939).
- 9 April – Saad Mohammed Raheem, writer.(b.1957)
- 18 May –
  - Iyad Futayyih, military officer (b.1942)
  - Adel Murad, politician.(b.1949)
- 21 July –Ahmad Matlub, Academic and politician.(b.1936)
- 16 August – Rafif al-Yasiri, plastic surgeon.(b.1985)
- 17 August – Sahar Taha, musician and journalist.(b.1957)
- 26 August– Rasha Al-Hasan, plastic surgeon.
- 19 September – Maeda Nazhat, singer.(b.1937)
- 20 September – Fadhil Barwari, Military officer.(b.1966)
- 25 September – Suʽad al-ʽAli, activist.
- 27 September – Tara Fares, Iraqi model and beauty blogger (b.1996)

== See also ==
- Timeline of Islamic State insurgency in Iraq (2018)
