= List of language regulators =

Authorities on standard languages

This is a list of bodies that consider themselves to be authorities on standard languages, often called language academies. Language academies are motivated by, or closely associated with, linguistic purism and prestige, and typically publish prescriptive dictionaries, which purport to officiate and prescribe the meaning of words and pronunciations. A language regulator may also have a more descriptive approach, however, while maintaining and promoting (but not imposing) a standard spelling. Many language academies are private institutions, although some are governmental bodies in different states, or enjoy some form of government-sanctioned status in one or more countries. There may also be multiple language academies attempting to regulate and codify the same language, sometimes based in different countries and sometimes influenced by political factors.

Many world languages have one or more language academies or official language bodies. However, the degree of control that the academies exert over these languages does not render the latter controlled natural languages in the sense that the various kinds of "simple English" (e.g., Basic English, Simplified Technical English) or George Orwell's fictional Newspeak are. They instead remain natural languages to a considerable extent and are thus not formal languages such as Attempto Controlled English. They have a degree of standardization that allows them to function as standard languages (e.g., standard French). The English language has never had a formal regulator in any country.

== Natural languages ==
Language	Territory	Regulator(s)	Founded
Amis	Republic of China	Council of Indigenous Peoples	1996
Afrikaans	South Africa; Namibia	Die Taalkommissie (The Language Commission)	1909
Akan	Ghana	Akan Orthography Committee	
Albanian	Albania	Academy of Sciences of Albania	1972
Albanian	Kosovo	Academy of Sciences and Arts of Kosovo	1975
Arabic	Arab League	Academy of the Arabic Language (مجمع اللغة العربية)	
Arabic	Algeria	Supreme Council of the Arabic language in Algeria (المجلس الأعلى للغة العربية بالجزائر)	1996
Arabic	Egypt	Academy of the Arabic Language in Cairo (مجمع اللغة العربية بالقاهرة)	1932
Arabic	Iraq	Iraqi Academy of Sciences (المجمع العلمي العراقي)	1948
Arabic	Jordan	Jordan Academy of Arabic (مجمع اللغة العربية الأردني)	1924
Arabic	Libya	Academy of the Arabic Language in Jamahiriya	
Arabic	Morocco	Academy of the Arabic Language in Morocco	1960
Arabic	Saudi Arabia	King Salman Global Academy for Arabic Language (مجمع الملك سلمان العالمي للغة العربية)	
Arabic	Somalia	Academy of the Arabic Language in Mogadishu	
Arabic	Sudan	Academy of the Arabic Language in Khartum	
Arabic	Syria	Academy of the Arabic Language in Damascus (مجمع اللغة العربية بدمشق)	1918
Arabic	Tunisia	Beit Al-Hikma Foundation (مؤسسة بيت الحكمة)	1992
Arabic	Israel	Academy of the Arabic Language in Israel (مجمع اللغة العربية)	2007
Aragonese	Aragon	Instituto de l'Aragonés at the Academia Aragonesa de la Lengua (Previously: Academy of the Aragonese)	2013
Armenian	Armenia	Armenian National Academy of Sciences (Հայաստանի Հանրապետության գիտությունների ազգային ակադեմիա)	1943
Assamese	India	Asam Sahitya Sabha (Assamese: অসম সাহিত্য সভা)	1917
Asturian	Asturias	Academy of the Asturian Language (Academia de la Llingua Asturiana)	1980
Azerbaijani	Azerbaijan; Iran	Azerbaijan National Academy of Sciences (Azərbaycan Milli Elmlər Akademiyası)	1945
Aymara	Bolivia	Language and Culture Institute of the Aymara Nation (Instituto de Lengua y Cultura de la Nación Aymara - ILCNA)	2013
Balochi	Iran; Pakistan; Afghanistan; Oman	Balochi Academy Sarbaz (بلۏچی زبانءِ ربیدجاہ)	2017
Basque	(Basque Country (autonomous community)) Basque Country; Navarre (France) French Basque Country	Euskaltzaindia, often translated as Royal Academy of the Basque language	1918
Belarusian	Belarus	The Jakub Kolas Institute of Language (Інстытут мовазнаўства імя Якуба Коласа) at the National Academy of Sciences of Belarus	1929
Bengali (Bangla)	Bangladesh	Bangla Academy (বাংলা একাডেমি)	1955
Bengali (Bangla)	India	Paschimbanga Bangla Akademi (পশ্চিমবঙ্গ বাংলা আকাদেমি)	1986
Berber	Morocco	Royal Institute of Amazight Culture (ⴰⵙⵉⵏⴰⴳ ⴰⴳⵍⴷⴰⵏ ⵏ ⵜⵓⵙⵙⵏⴰ ⵜⴰⵎⴰⵣⵉⵖⵜ)	2001
Berber	Algeria	High Commission for Amazighity (ⵙⵇⴰⵎⵓ ⵓⵏⵏⵉⴳ ⵏ ⵜⵉⵎⵓⵣⵖⴰ)	1995
Berber	Algeria	Algerian Academy of Amazigh Language	2017
Bhojpuri	India	Bhojpuri Academy, Bihar	
Bhojpuri	India	Maithili - Bhojpuri Academy, Delhi	
Bhojpuri	India	Bhojpuri Sahitya Academy, Madhya Pradesh	
Central Bikol	Philippines	Academia Bicolana defunct	
Bosnian	Bosnia and Herzegovina; Sandžak	University of Sarajevo	
Breton	Brittany	Public Office for the Breton Language (Ofis Publik ar Brezhoneg)	2010
Bulgarian	Bulgaria	Institute for Bulgarian Language (Институт за български език)	1942
Burmese	Myanmar	Myanmar Language Commission (မြန်မာစာအဖွဲ့)	1963
Catalan	Catalonia	Institute for Catalan Studies (Institut d'Estudis Catalans)	1907
Catalan	Valencian Community	Valencian Language Academy (Acadèmia Valenciana de la Llengua)	2001
Catalan	Aragon	Institut Aragonès del Català at the Academia Aragonesa de la Lengua	2013
Cebuano	Philippines	Visayan Academy of Arts and Letters (Akademyang Bisaya)	
Cherokee	Cherokee Nation	Council of the Cherokee Nation (ᏣᎳᎩᎯ ᎠᏰᎵ)	
Standard Chinese	China	State Language Work Committee (国家语言文字工作委员会)	1986
Standard Chinese	Republic of China	Ministry of Education (教育部)	
Standard Chinese	Singapore	Promote Mandarin Council (讲华语运动理事会, 推廣華語理事會)	1979
Standard Chinese	Malaysia	Chinese Language Standardisation Council of Malaysia (马来西亚华语规范理事会, 馬來西亞華語規範理事會)	
Cornish	Cornwall	Akademi Kernewek (Cornish Academy)	2015
Cornish	Cornwall	Cornish Language Office (Sodhva an Yeth Kernewek)	
Croatian	Croatia	Institute of Croatian Language and Linguistics (Institut za hrvatski jezik i jezikoslovlje)	1948
Croatian	Bosnia and Herzegovina	Institute of Croatian Language and Linguistics (Institut za hrvatski jezik i jezikoslovlje)	1948
Czech	Czech Republic	Institute of the Czech Language (Ústav pro jazyk český)	1946
Danish	Denmark	Danish Language Council (Dansk Sprognævn)	1955
Dalecarlian	(Sweden) Dalarna County	Ulum Dalska	1984
Divehi	Maldives	Dhivehi Academy (ދިވެހި އެކެޑަމީ)	2011
Dutch	Netherlands; Belgium; Suriname	Dutch Language Union (Nederlandse Taalunie)	1980
Dzongkha	Bhutan	Dzongkha Development Commission (རྫོང་ཁ་གོང་འཕེལ་ལྷན་ཚོགས)	1968
Estonian	Estonia	Institute of the Estonian Language (Eesti Keele Instituut)	1993
Faroese	Faroe Islands	Faroese Language Board (Málráðið)	1985
Filipino	Philippines	Commission on the Filipino Language (Komisyon sa Wikang Filipino)	1937
Finnish	Finland	Institute for the Languages of Finland (Kotimaisten kielten keskus)	1976
French	France	French Academy (Académie française)	1635
French	France	General Delegation for the French language and the languages of France (Délégation générale à la langue française et aux langues de France)	1989
French	Belgium	Royal Academy of French Language and Literature of Belgium (Académie royale de langue et de littérature françaises de Belgique)	1920
French	Quebec	Québec Office of the French Language (Office québécois de la langue française)	1961
Friulian	Friuli-Venezia Giulia	Regional Agency for Friulian Language (Agjenzie Regjonâl pe Lenghe Furlane)	2001
Galician	Galicia	Royal Galician Academy (Real Academia Galega)	1906
Galician	Galicia	Galician Language Association (Associaçom Galega da Língua)	1981
Georgian	Georgia	Government of Georgia (საქართველოს მთავრობა)	
German	Germany; Austria; Switzerland; South Tyrol; Belgium; Alsace; Liechtenstein; Luxembourg; Namibia; Syddanmark; Opole Voivodeship; Silesian Voivodeship	Council for German Orthography (Rat für deutsche Rechtschreibung)	2004
Greenlandic	Greenland	The Greenland Language Secretariat (Oqaasileriffik)	1998
Greek	Greece; Cyprus	Centre for the Greek Language (Κέντρο Ελληνικής Γλώσσας)	
Guarani	Paraguay	Guarani Language Academy (Guarani Ñe’ẽ Rerekuapavẽ)	2013
Gujarati	India	Gujarat Sahitya Akademi (ગુજરાત સાહિત્ય અકાદમી)	1981
Hakka	Republic of China	Hakka Affairs Council (客家委員會)	2001
Haitian Creole	Haiti	Haitian Creole Academy (Akademi Kreyòl Ayisyen)	2014
Hebrew	Israel	Academy of the Hebrew Language (האקדמיה ללשון העברית)	1890
Hindi	India	Central Hindi Directorate (केन्द्रीय हिन्दी निदेशालय)	1960
Hmar	India	Hmar Literature Society	
Hungarian	Hungary; Slovakia; Romania; Serbia; Austria	Hungarian Research Centre for Linguistics (Nyelvtudományi Kutatóközpont)	1949
Icelandic	Iceland	Árni Magnússon Institute for Icelandic Studies (Stofnun Árna Magnússonar í íslenskum fræðum)	1962
Igbo	Nigeria	Society for Promoting Igbo Language and Culture	1949
Indonesian	Indonesia	Agency for Language Development and Cultivation (Badan Pengembangan dan Pembinaan Bahasa)	1947
Inuktitut	Canada	Inuit Tapiriit Kanatami (ᐃᓄᐃᑦ ᑕᐱᕇᑦ ᑲᓇᑕᒥ)	1971
Irish	Ireland; Northern Ireland	Irish Institute (Foras na Gaeilge)	1999
Italian	Italy; San Marino; Switzerland; Vatican City; Monaco; Corsica; Istria County; Eritrea; Libya	Accademia della Crusca (Academy of the Bran)	1583
Japanese	Japan	No official centralized regulation, but de facto regulations by Agency for Cultural Affairs (文化庁) at the Ministry of Education of Japan (文部科学省)	1934 (predecessor), 2000 (current)
Kabiye	Togo	Kabiye Academy (Académie kabiyè)	1975
Kannada	(India) Karnataka	Various academies and Government of Karnataka	
Kashubian	Poland	The Kashubian Language Council (Radzëzna Kaszëbsczégò Jãzëka)	2006
Kazakh	Kazakhstan	Ministry of Science and Higher Education of the Republic of Kazakhstan (Қазақстан Республикасының Ғылым және жоғары білім министрлігі)	2022
Khmer	Cambodia	Royal Academy of Cambodia (រាជបណ្ឌិត្យសភាកម្ពុជា)	1965
Korean	South Korea	National Institute of the Korean Language (국립국어원/國立國語院)	1991
Korean	North Korea	The Language Research Institute, Academy of Social Science (사회과학원 어학연구소)	
Korean	China	China Korean Language Regulatory Commission (중국조선어규범위원회/中国朝鲜语规范委员会)	
Kven	Norway	Kainun institutti – kvensk institutt	2007
Kurdish	Kurdistan	Kurdish Academy (ئەکادیمیای کوردی)	1971
Kyrgyz	Kyrgyzstan	National Committee for State Language under the President of the Kyrgyz Republic (Кыргыз Республикасынын Президентине караштуу Мамлекеттик тил боюнча улуттук комиссия)	2009
Ladin	Italy	Istitut Ladin Micurá de Rü	1976
Lao	Laos	Educational Science Research Institute, Ministry of Education and Sports (ສະຖາບັນຄົ້ນຄວ້າວິທະຍາສາດການສືກສາ ກະຊວງສຶກສາທິການ ແລະ ກີລາ); Institute of Social Sciences, Faculty of Arts, National University of Laos (ສະຖາບັນວິທະຍາສາດສັງຄົມ ຄະນະອັກສອນສາດ ມະຫາວິທະຍາໄລແຫ່ງຊາດລາວ)	
Latin	Holy See	Pontifical Academy for Latin (Pontificia Academia Latinitatis)	2012
Latin	Holy See	International Code of Botanical Nomenclature (of the International Association for Plant Taxonomy: botanical Latin)	1867
Latin	Holy See	International Code of Zoological Nomenclature (of the International Commission on Zoological Nomenclature: zoological Latin)	1905
Latvian	Latvia	Latvian State Language Center (Valsts Valodas Centrs)	1992
Lithuanian	Lithuania	Commission of the Lithuanian Language (Valstybinė lietuvių kalbos komisija)	1990
Lusoga	Uganda	Lusoga Language Authority	
Luxembourgish	Luxembourg	Council for the Luxembourgish Language (Conseil fir d'Lëtzebuerger Sprooch)	1998
Luxembourgish	Luxembourg	Centre for the Luxembourgish Language (Zenter fir d'Lëtzebuerger Sprooch)	2018
Macedonian	North Macedonia	Linguistics and Literary Science Department at the Macedonian Academy of Sciences and Arts	1967
Malagasy	Madagascar	Malagasy Academy (Akademia Malagasy)	1902
Malay	Malaysia	Institute of Language and Literature (Dewan Bahasa dan Pustaka)	1956
Malay	Brunei	Language and Literature Bureau (Dewan Bahasa dan Pustaka)	1960
Malay	Singapore	Malay Language Council, Singapore (Majlis Bahasa Melayu Singapura)	
Malayalam	India	Kerala Sahitya Akademi (കേരള സാഹിത്യ അക്കാദമി)	1956
Maltese	Malta	National Council for the Maltese Language (Il-Kunsill Nazzjonali tal-Ilsien Malti)	2005
Manx	Isle of Man	Manx Language Advisory Council (Coonceil ny Gaelgey)	1985
Māori	New Zealand	Māori Language Commission (Te Taura Whiri i te Reo Māori)	1987
Marathi	India	Maharashtra Sahitya Parishad (महाराष्ट्र साहित्य परिषद)	1906
Meitei (officially called Manipuri)	India	Directorate of Language Planning and Implementation (ꯗꯥꯏꯔꯦꯛꯇꯣꯔꯦꯠ ꯑꯣꯐ ꯂꯦꯡꯒ꯭ꯋꯦꯖ ꯄ꯭ꯂꯥꯅꯤꯡ ꯑꯦꯟ꯭ꯗ ꯏꯝꯄ꯭ꯂꯤꯃꯦꯟꯇꯦꯁꯟ)	2013
Meitei (officially called Manipuri)	India	Manipuri Sahitya Parishad (ꯃꯅꯤꯄꯨꯔꯤ ꯁꯥꯍꯤꯇ꯭ꯌ ꯄꯔꯤꯁꯗ)	1935
Mirandese	Portugal	Institute of the Mirandese Language (Anstituto de la Lhéngua Mirandesa)	2000
Mixtec	Mexico	Academy of the Mixtec Language (Ve'e Tu'un Sávi)	1997
Khalkha Mongolian	Mongolia	Council of the official state language (Төрийн хэлний зөвлөл). Decisions have to be confirmed by the Mongolian government.	
Chakhar Mongolian	China	Council for Language and Literature Work	
Nepali	Nepal	Nepal Academy (नेपाल प्रज्ञा–प्रतिष्ठान)	1957
Northern Frisian	North Frisia	Northern Frisian Institute (Nordfriisk Instituut)	1964
Norwegian (Riksmål/Bokmål)	Norway	Norwegian Academy (Det Norske Akademi for Språk og Litteratur)	1953
Norwegian Bokmål; Norwegian Nynorsk	Norway	Norwegian Language Council (Språkrådet)	2005
Occitan	Occitania; France; Spain; Monaco; Italy	Occitan Language Council (Conselh de la Lenga Occitana), Permanent Congress of the Occitan Language (Congrès Permanent de la Lenga Occitana); Institute of Aranese Studies (Institut d'Estudis Aranesi) (Aranese)	1996
Odia	India	Odisha Sahitya Akademi (ଓଡ଼ିଶା ସାହିତ୍ୟ ଏକାଡେମୀ)	1957
Pashto	Afghanistan	Academy of Sciences of Afghanistan (د علومو اکاډمي نښه)	1978
Pashto	Pakistan	Pashto Academy (پښتو اکېډمي)	1955
Persian	Iran	Academy of Persian Language and Literature (فرهنگستان زبان و ادب فارسی)	1935
Persian	Afghanistan	Academy of Sciences of Afghanistan (آکادمی علوم افغانستان)	1978
Paiwan	Republic of China	Council of Indigenous Peoples	1996
Polish	Poland	Polish Language Council (Rada Języka Polskiego)	1996
Portuguese	Portugal	Lisbon Academy of Sciences (Academia das Ciências de Lisboa)	1779
Portuguese	Brazil	Brazilian Academy of Letters (Academia Brasileira de Letras)	1897
Portuguese	Galicia	Galician Language Association (Associaçom Galega da Língua)	1981
Quechua	Ecuador	Academy of the Kichwa Language (Kichwa Amawta Kamachik/ Academia de la Lengua Kichwa, 'KAMAK')	2003
Quechua	Peru	Peruvian Ministries of Education and of Culture (as part of their functions)	
Quechua	Department of Cuzco	High Academy of the Quechua Language (Qheswa Simi Hamut'ana Kuraq Suntur/ Academia Mayor de la Lengua Quechua)	1953
Quechua	Department of Cajamarca	Cajamarca Regional Academy of the Quechua Language (Academia Regional del Idioma Quechua de Cajamarca - ARIQ)	1986
Quechua	Department of Ancash	Ancash Regional Academy of Quechua (Academia Regional de Quechua de Ancash - ARQA)	
Quechua	Bolivia	Language and Culture Institute of the Quechua Nation (Instituto de Lengua y Cultura de la Nación Quechua - ILCNQ)	2013
Quechua	Department of Cochabamba	Cochabamba Regional Academy of the Quechua Language (Academia Regional de la Lengua Quechua de Cochabamba)	
Rohingya	Arakan (Rakhine State)	Rohingya Language Academy (𐴌𐴟𐴇𐴥𐴝𐴚𐴒𐴙𐴝 𐴎𐴟𐴁𐴝𐴕 𐴀𐴠𐴑𐴝𐴋𐴠𐴔𐴞)	
Romanian	Romania	Romanian Academy (Academia Română)	1866
Romanian	Moldova	Academy of Sciences of Moldova (Academia de Științe a Moldovei)	1961
Romansh	Switzerland	Lia Rumantscha	1919
Russian	Russia; Belarus; Kazakhstan; Kyrgyzstan; Tajikistan	Russian Language Institute (Институт русского языка)	1944
Scots	Scotland	Scots Language Centre (Centre for the Scots Leid)	1993
Scots	Northern Ireland; Ireland	Ulster-Scots Agency (Tha Boord o Ulstèr-Scotch)	1999
Scottish Gaelic	Scotland	The Gaelic Board (Bòrd na Gàidhlig)	2006
Secwepemctsín	Canada	Secwepemc Cultural Education Society	1983
Serbian and Montenegrin	Serbia; Montenegro; Srpska	Board for Standardization of the Serbian Language (Одбор за стандардизацију српског језика)	1997
Sicilian	Sicily	Cademia Siciliana	2016
Sindhi	Pakistan	Sindhi Language Authority (سنڌي ٻولي جو با اختيار ادارو)	1992
Sinhala	Sri Lanka	Hela Havula (හෙළ හවුල)	1941
Slovak	Slovakia	Slovak Academy of Sciences (Slovenská akadémia vied)	1942
Slovene	Slovenia	Slovenian Academy of Sciences and Arts (Slovenska akademija znanosti in umetnosti)	1938
Somali	Djibouti; Ethiopia; Somalia	Regional Somali Language Academy (Akademiye Goboleedka Af Soomaaliga)	2013
Sorbian	Germany; Czech Republic; Poland	Sorbian Institute (Serbski institut)	1951
Spanish	Spain; Colombia; Ecuador; Mexico; El Salvador; Venezuela; Chile; Peru; Guatemala; Costa Rica; Philippines; Panama; Cuba; Paraguay; Bolivia; Dominican Republic; Nicaragua; Argentina; Uruguay; Honduras; Puerto Rico; United States; Equatorial Guinea; Israel	Association of Spanish Language Academies (Asociación de Academias de la Lengua Española)	1951
Swahili	Tanzania	National Swahili Council (Baraza la Kiswahili la Taifa)	1967
Swahili	Kenya	National Kiswahili Association (Chama cha Kiswahili cha Taifa)	1998
Swedish	Sweden	Language Council of Sweden (Språkrådet)	1941
Swedish	Sweden	Swedish Academy (Svenska Akademien)	1786
Swedish	Finland	Institute for the Languages of Finland (Institutet för de inhemska språken)	
Tajik	Tajikistan; Uzbekistan	Rudaki Institute of Language and Literature (Институти забон ва адабиёт ба номи А. Рӯдакии)	1932
Tamil	India	Department of Tamil Development and Information, Tamil Nadu (தமிழ் வளர்ச்சி மற்றும் தகவல் துறை, தமிழ் நாடு)	1831
Tamil	India	International Institute of Tamil Studies (உலகத் தமிழாராய்ச்சி நிறுவனம்)	1970
Tamil	India	Tamil University (தமிழ்ப் பல்கலைக்கழகம்)	1981
Tamil	India	Central Institute of Classical Tamil (செம்மொழித் தமிழாய்வு மத்திய நிறுவனம்)	2008
Tamil	India	World Tamil Sangam (உலகத் தமிழ்ச் சங்கம்)	2016
Tamil	Sri Lanka	Department of Official Languages (அதிகாரப்பூர்வ மொழிகள் துறை)	1931
Tamil	Singapore	Tamil Language Council (வளர்தமிழ் இயக்கம்)	2000
Tamil	Malaysia	Malaysian Tamil Language Standardisation Council (மலேசியத் தமிழ் மொழியின் காப்பகம்)	2019
Tamil	Canada	Federation of Tamil Sangams of North America	1987
Tamil	United States	Federation of Tamil Sangams of North America	1987
Tatar	Tatarstan	Tatarstan Academy of Sciences (Татарстан Республикасы Фәннәр академиясе)	1804
Telugu	India	Telugu Academy, Official Language Commission of Government of Andhra Pradesh, and Centre of Excellence for Studies in Classical Telugu	
Tetum	East Timor	National Institute of Linguistics at the National University of East Timor	
Thai	Thailand	Royal Society of Thailand (ราชบัณฑิตยสภา)	1926
Tibetan	(China) Tibet Autonomous Region	Committee for Tibetan Language Affairs	
Tibetan	India	Committee for the Standardisation of the Tibetan Language	
Tulu	India	Karnataka Tulu Sahitya Academy	
Turkish	Turkey; Cyprus; Northern Cyprus	Turkish Language Association (Türk Dil Kurumu)	1932
Ukrainian	Ukraine	NASU Institute of Ukrainian Language (Інститут української мови)	1991
Urdu	Pakistan	National Language Promotion Department (اِدارۀ فروغِ قومی زُبان)	
Urdu	India	National Council for Promotion of Urdu Language (قومی کونسل برائے فروغ اردو زبان)	
Urhobo	Nigeria	Urhobo Studies Association	
Vietnamese	Vietnam	Institute of Linguistics of Vietnam Academy of Social Sciences	
Võro	Estonia	Võro Institute (Võro Instituut)	
Waray	Philippines	Sanghiran san Binisaya ha Samar ug Leyte (Academy of the Visayan Language of Samar and Leyte) defunct	
Welsh	Wales	Welsh Language Commissioner (Comisiynydd y Gymraeg)	2012
West Frisian	Friesland	Frisian Academy (Fryske Akademy)	1938
Wolof	Senegal	Centre de linguistique appliquée de Dakar (Center of Applied Linguistics of Dakar at the Cheikh Anta Diop University)	
Yiddish	United States; Belarus; Israel; Netherlands; Poland; Romania; Russia; Sweden; Ukraine	YIVO Institute for Jewish Research (ייִוואָ)	1925
Yoruba	Nigeria	Yoruba Academy	2007

== Constructed languages ==
Apart from the Akademio de Esperanto, most constructed languages (also called conlangs) have no true linguistic regulators or language academies.

=== Auxiliary languages ===
Language	Regulator(s)
Esperanto	Akademio de Esperanto
Ido	Uniono por la Linguo Internaciona Ido
Lingua Franca Nova	Asosia per Lingua Franca Nova
Volapük	Kadäm Volapüka

==== Esperanto ====
Esperanto and Ido have been constructed (or planned) by a person or small group, before being adopted and further developed by communities of users through natural language evolution.

Bodies such as the Akademio de Esperanto look at questions of usage in the light of the original goals and principles of the language.

==== Interlingua ====
Interlingua has no regulating body, as its vocabulary, grammar, and orthography are viewed as a product of ongoing social forces. In theory, Interlingua therefore evolves independent from any human regulator. Interlingua's vocabulary is verified and recorded by dynamically applying certain general principles to an existing set of natural languages and their etymologies. The International Auxiliary Language Association ceased to exist in 1954, and according to the secretary of Union Mundial de Interlingua "Interlingua doesn't need its Academy".

=== Other constructed languages ===
Language	Creator(s)	Regulator(s)
Klingon	Marc Okrand	
Lojban	Logical Language Group	
Naʼvi	Paul Frommer	
Talossan	Robert Ben Madison	Comità per l'Útzil del Glheþ
Sindarin	J. R. R. Tolkien	Elvish Linguistic Fellowship
Quenya	J. R. R. Tolkien	Elvish Linguistic Fellowship

== Other bodies ==
These bodies do not attempt to regulate any language in a prescriptive manner and are primarily concerned with aiding and advising the government on policies regarding language usage.

- Hong Kong: Official Language Division Civil Service Bureau Government of Hong Kong – concerned with matters concerning government language policy
- Macau: Departamento dos Assuntos Linguísticos of the Public Administration and Civil Service Bureau of the Government of Macau –concerned with matters concerning government language policy

== See also ==
- Proposals for an English Academy
- Language policy
- Language revival
- Language planning
- Linguistic purism
- Languages in censuses
