= Abdulkareem Khalefah =

Jordanian Arabic literature professor

- عبد الكريم خليفة
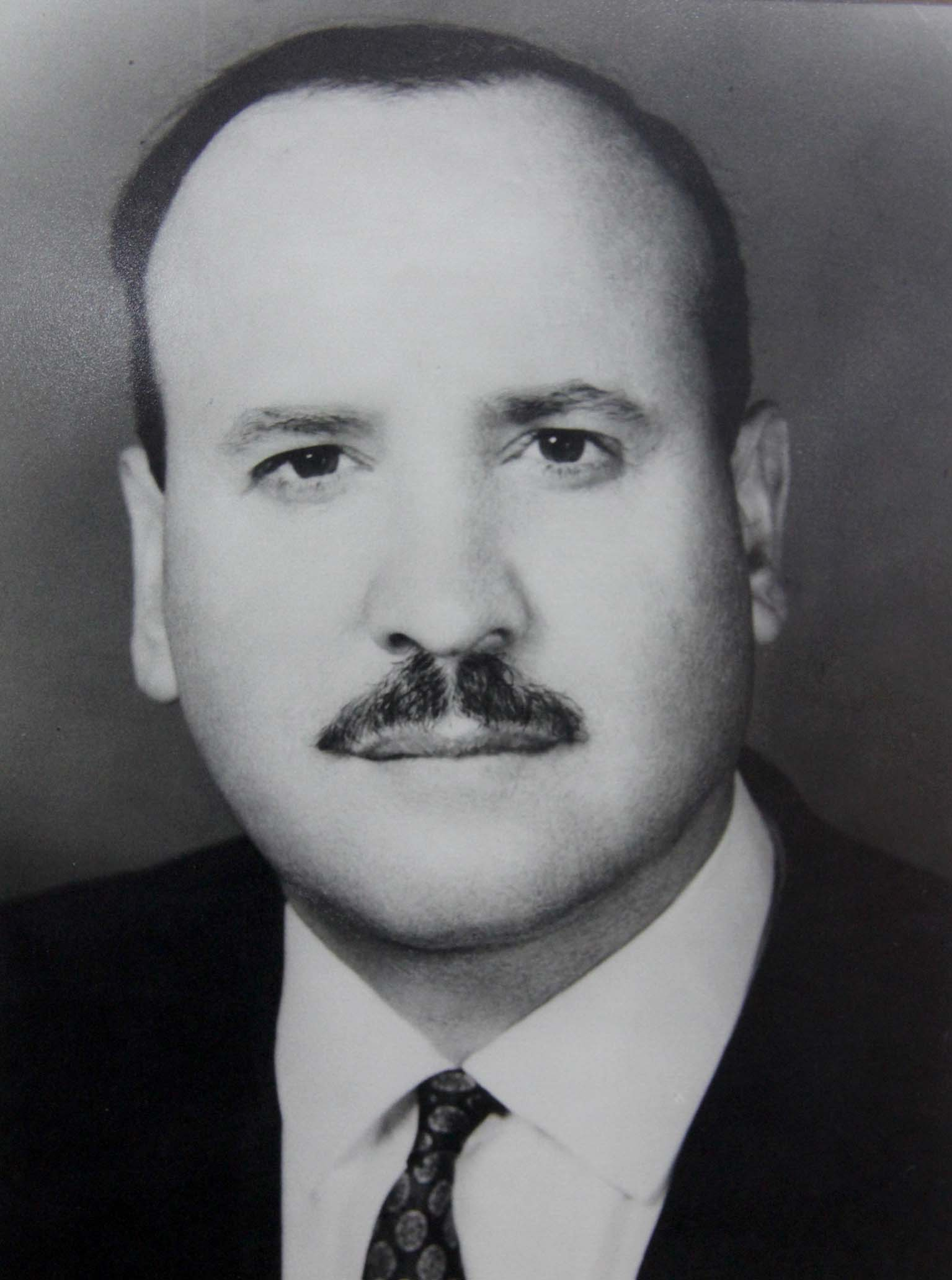
- Khalefah in 1968

President of the Jordan Academy of Arabic
- In office 1976–2015
- Succeeded by: Khaled Al-Karaki

2nd President of the University of Jordan
- In office 1968–1971
- Preceded by: Nasir al-Din al-Asad
- Succeeded by: Abdelsalam Majali

Personal details
- Born: Abdul Karim Khalifa Al-Nsour; 1924 As-Salt, Jordan
- Died: August 17, 2020 (aged 95–96)
- Awards: Order of Independence; Excellent Education Medal; Order of Al-Hussein for Distinguished Contributions; Order of the Star of Jordan

Abdulkareem Khalefah Al-Nsour (عبد الكريم خليفة, 1924 – 17 August 2020) was a Jordanian professor of Arabic literature, former president of the Jordanian Academy of the Arabic Language, and former president of the University of Jordan. He has dozens of books in the Arabic library on language and literature.

== Early life and education ==
Abdulkareem Khalefah was born in the city of As-Salt, the capital of Balqa in western Jordan, in 1924. He memorized the Quran up to Surah "Ya-Sin" at the Kuttab (traditional school), where he also learned to read, write, and acquire basic arithmetic skills. He then enrolled in a government school that provided both primary and secondary education, obtaining his Jordanian General Secondary Certificate in 1942. He was sent on a scholarship to Baghdad to specialize in Arabic language and literature, earning a bachelor's degree in Arabic language and literature with honors from the Higher Teachers' Institute in 1946. He later traveled at his own expense to Paris, where he earned a Doctorate in Letters with high honors from the University of Paris in 1954.

== Career ==
His professional experience was comprehensive in the field of education; he worked as a teacher at Al-Tafilah Primary School in Jordan (1942–1943). After returning from Baghdad, he taught Arabic language and literature at the Fourth Preparatory School in Aleppo (1946–1947), then taught the principles of general and specific teaching methods for Arabic language at Aleppo (1947–1950). He also taught the principles of general and specific teaching methods for Arabic language at the Teachers' Institute in Aleppo under a contract with the Syrian government.

After obtaining his doctorate and returning from Paris, he worked as an inspector for Arabic language and literature at the Ministry of Education in Jordan in Amman (1956–1963). When the University of Jordan was established in Amman, he became an assistant professor (later promoted to associate professor) in the Department of Arabic Language and Literature at the Faculty of Arts in 1963.

He rose through the ranks and became the president of the University of Jordan from 1968 to 1971. He chaired the Jordan Academy of Arabic from its founding in 1976 in a non-full-time capacity, and then full-time from 1994. He was also a member of the Jordanian Arabization, Translation, and Publication Committee since its establishment in 1961, and participated in all Arabization conferences as well as a number of scientific conferences and workshops across the Arab world. Khalifa published a large number of articles, books, and scientific research, with his first publication appearing in 1949.

== Awards ==
He received several honors, including:

- Order of Independence in 1971
- Excellent Education Medal in 1978
- Order of Al-Hussein for Distinguished Contributions, First Class in 2000.
- Order of the Star of Jordan, First Class in 2015

== Death ==
He died on Monday, 17 August 2020, at the age of 95–96.
