= Ashraf Kurdi =

Jordanian politician (1937–2012)

Personal details
- Born: 1937
- Died: April 5, 2012 (aged 74–75)

Ashraf Ali Saydo Al-Kurdi (1937 – April 5, 2012) was a Jordanian politician and physician. He served as the former Minister of Health of Jordan, was a former member of the Jordanian Senate, and was the personal physician to Palestinian President Yasser Arafat.

== Education ==
Ashraf was born in Amman in 1937 to a family whose roots trace back to the Diyarbakir region in Turkey. His great-grandfather had migrated to Jordan in the 19th century. Ashraf Al-Kurdi traveled to Iraq to complete his secondary education in Baghdad, where he earned the Iraqi baccalaureate. Subsequently, he enrolled in the College of Medicine at the University of Baghdad, from which he obtained a bachelor's degree in Medicine and Surgery.

== Personal life ==
Al-Kurdi is married and has four sons: Omar, Khaled, Luai, and Talal.

== Awards ==
Ashraf Al-Kurdi was bestowed with the following medals:

- The Jordanian Order of Independence, in 1970.
- The Jordanian Order of the Star, in 1979.
- The Jordanian Order of Dignity.
- The Jordanian Order of Meritorious Service.
- The Star of Palestine, awarded by Palestinian President Yasser Arafat.
- The Star of Jerusalem, in 2005, awarded by Palestinian President Mahmoud Abbas.
- The Order of Al-Hussein for Distinguished Contributions, in 2007.
