= Iraqi Academy of Sciences =

Academic institution in Iraq

- Other name: المجمع العلمي العراقي (Arabic)
- Established: 26 November 1947; 78 years ago
- President: Mohammed Hussein Al-Yassin
- Address: Al-Wazireya Street, Baghdad, Iraq
- Location: Iraq
- Coordinates: 33°22′14.8″N 44°23′2.4″E
- Interactive map of Iraqi Academy of Sciences
- Website: www.iraqacademy.iq

The Iraqi Academy of Sciences (Arabic: المجمع العلمي العراقي) is a scholarly institution based in Baghdad, Iraq. Established in 1947, the academy was initially concerned primarily with the study and development of the Arabic language. It later was expanded to include Kurdish and Syriac, and subsequently a wider range of scientific and academic disciplines.

The Iraqi Academy of Sciences is not a member of the International Science Council (ISC), instead the Ministry of Higher Education and Scientific Research has represented Iraq in the ISC since 1976.

== History ==
=== Establishment ===
Main building of the academy (1965)

The Iraqi Academy of Sciences was formally established on 26 November 1947 under Regulation No. 62 of 1947 during the Kingdom of Iraq. The academy was affiliated with the Iraqi Ministry of Education but was granted administrative and financial autonomy when it was founded. Its first formal meeting was held on 12 January 1948. The Translation, Authorship and Publication Committee, established in 1945, had been the immediate precursor prior to the institution's founding.

The Iraqi Academy of Sciences was the fourth major Arabic linguistic academy to be established, following those in Damascus, Beirut and Cairo. Its original mandate was focused on preserving and developing the Arabic language and adapting it to developments in modern science, technology and contemporary life. Its responsibilities included conducting research into Arabic literature and the history and civilisation of Iraq and the Arab world, studying Muslim contributions to Arab culture, preserving and publishing rare Arabic manuscripts and documents, encouraging translation and scholarly writing, and promoting scientific research in Iraq.

Between the late 1960s and the early 1970s, separate academies on the Kurdish and Syriac languages were established in Iraq. These institutions sought to develop and regulate their respective languages in a manner comparable to the academy's work on Arabic. In 1978, these academies were unified under the Iraqi Academy of Sciences. The reorganisation brought scholarly work relating to the three languages within a common institutional framework.

A significant reorganisation took place in 1996, following the enactment of Law No.3 of 1995, which broadened the academy's functions beyond its traditional emphasis on language and cultural heritage. The academy was expanded to encompass applied sciences and other fields of knowledge. The 1996 reforms also altered the academy's governance structure, increasing the government's influence over the appointment of its president and members.

=== Since 2003 ===
The academy's activities were disrupted following the 2003 invasion of Iraq. Its premises were looted during the ensuing disorder, with more than 80% of its books stolen. Other Iraqi cultural and academic institutions were similarly affected during this period.

A separate organisation, the Iraqi National Academy of Sciences, was established in London in November 2003 by Iraqi scientists living outside the country. Its founders presented the organisation as an alternative to the Baghdad based academy, which they regarded as having been too closely associated with the government of Saddam Hussein. The new academy was intended to operate autonomously with independent funding and was expected to relocate to Baghdad once conditions permitted. However, it subsequently became inactive.

== President ==
The presidents of the Iraqi Academy of Sciences since its establishment are:

- Mohammed Ridha Al-Shabibi (1948–1949)
- Munir al-Qadi (1949–1953 and 1959)
- Naji al-Asil (1953–1954 and 1961–1963)
- Abdul-Razzaq Muhyi al-Din (1965–1979)
- Salih Ahmad al-Ali (1979–1996)
- Najih al-Rawi (1996–2000)
- Mahmoud Hayawi Hammash (2000–2004)
- Dakhel Hassan Jariw (2004–2007)
- Ahmad Matlub (2007–2018)
- Abdul-Majid Hamza Al-Nasser (2018–2021)
- Mohammed Hussein Al Yassin (2021–present)

== Structure ==
Currently, the Iraqi Academy of Sciences comprises 5 departments, and 3 commissions, including:

Structure of Iraqi Academy of Sciences
Departments	Commissions
Arab Language; Arab & Islamic Heritage; Humanities (Psychology, Sociology, Philosophy, Arts); Pure Sciences (Mathematics, Computer Science, Physics, Chemistry, Biology); Applied Sciences (Medicine, Engineering, Agricultural Science)	Research Terminology; Kurdish Language; Syriac Language

== See also ==
- Kurdish Academy
- List of Arabic language academies
- List of language regulators
