= Mahmoud Hafith =

Egyptian entomologist (1912–2011)

- محمود حافظ
- Born: January 10, 1912; El Senbellawein, Dakahliya Governorate, Egypt
- Died: December 23, 2011 (aged 99); Cairo, Egypt
- Education: Cairo University (BSc 1935, MSc 1938, PhD 1940)
- Known for: First Egyptian to receive a PhD in entomology; President of the Arabic Language Academy in Cairo (2005–2011); President of the Egyptian Academy of Sciences
- Awards: State Merit Prize in Science (1977); Nile Prize in Science (1999)
- Scientific career
- Fields: Insect physiology, medical and veterinary entomology, biological control

Mahmoud Hafith (Arabic: محمود حافظ; January 10, 1912 – December 23, 2011) was a pioneering Egyptian scientist in entomology and former president of the Egyptian Scientific Academy and the Arabic Language Academy in Cairo. He was the first Egyptian to obtain a doctorate in entomology, and the second Egyptian to combine the presidency of the Arabic Language Academy and the Academic of sciences, after the Dean of Arabic Literature, Taha Hussein. He died one week after the fire at the Egyptian Scientific Institute, following protests in Cairo.

== Early life and education ==
Hafith was born on January 10, 1912, to a family with a long history in the struggle against British colonialism. His father established what was known as the "Kingdom of Faraskour", which was formed in Damietta to expel the English, and he was forced to sell all his possessions to spend on national work, until the Egyptian leader Saad Zaghloul paid 50 pounds to help his son complete his education.

Hafith began his education at Farskour kuttab, where he memorized the Qur’an. However, he left the school and moved to Cairo to complete his education at the Saeidia High School at his mother's wishes. He graduated from the Faculty of Science, Cairo University, in 1935 and was appointed as a lecturer. He obtained a master's degree in 1938, and then a doctorate degree in entomology in 1940, becoming the first Egyptian to do so. He continued his research at the University of London and the University of Cambridge in 1953, where he was appointed as a Chair Professor of the Department of Entomology. When he returned to Cairo, he was appointed as Vice Dean of the Faculty of Science in 1964.

== Career ==
Hafith contributed to the establishment of the Department of Insects and Plant Protection at the National Research Center and worked on developing it and preparing its researchers and a research unit at the Atomic Energy Authority and the Regional Center for Radioisotopes. He contributed to developing the Vector Research Institute at the Ministry of Health, by setting up research programs for it, overseeing its implementation, and preparing scientific cadres.

He also participated in the planning of research at the level of the Republic during his tenure as the Undersecretary of the Ministry of Scientific Research, and participated in more than fifty international conferences in biological sciences, entomology and pest control, as well as in the history of science. He has also given many lectures at European, American, African and Asian universities as a visiting professor there

In addition to this scientific study, he worked as Secretary General of the Islamic Hidaya Association with the late Sheikh Muhammad Al-Khader Hussein, Sheikh of the former Al-Azhar Mosque for seventeen years.

=== Academic of sciences ===
Hafith was appointed as an undersecretary for the Supreme Council for Scientific Research in 1968, after which he returned as head of the entomology department until 1972, when he became a full-time professor at the college. In 1977, he was chosen as an expert in the Academic of sciences in the committee of biology and agricultural sciences.

Since his appointment as a member of the Scientific Academy, Hafith has actively contributed to the activity of the Academy, in its council and conference, and in the work of the committees for which he works as a rapporteur, namely the Committee of Biological Sciences and Agriculture, the Committee of Chemistry and Pharmacy, as well as his membership in the Awards Committee and the Geology and Petroleum Committees.

On March 21, 1977, the day of Hafith's reception, Dr. Mahmoud Mukhtar remarked about him: "A bright figure who carried the torch of knowledge and education for a long time with faithfulness and adequacy, and was encrusted with pearls of the true religion and the blessed Arabic language."

=== Academy of the Arabic Language ===
Hafith's involvement in the Arabic Language Academy goes back to 1956, when he was cooperating with Nazir Bey, a member of the Academy, in translating some terms into Arabic. Then he was chosen as an expert in the complex in 1964. Hafith participated in many council committees before he was unanimously elected vice president of the council in 1996. He then succeeded Shawqi Deif in chairing the council in 2005 after another unanimous election.

Through the Arabic Language Academy, Hafith conducted dozens of studies on scientific dictionaries, the Arabization of science, and participated in translating and Arabizing thousands of terms through the committees of biology, agriculture, chemistry, pharmacy, and oil. Hafith defended Arabic from the accusation that it does not understand modern sciences, considering it a "falsehood", and called for the continuous effort to Arabize sciences, including medicine. He also warned of the widening gap between the new generations and the Arabs, considering the reason for this to be the spread of foreign schools that are not interested in Arabic.

== Activities at the national level ==
1. Vice president of the Arabic Language Academy in Cairo until 2005, then its president until his death in 2011.
2. President of the Egyptian Scientific Academy until his death. He is the only Egyptian who presided over the two societies (the Academy of the Arabic Language and the Egyptian Scientific Academy) at the same time.
3. Member of the National Council for Education and Scientific Research.
4. Member of the Academy of Scientific Research and Technology Council.
5. President of the Egyptian Society for the History of Science.
6. President of the Egyptian Society of Entomology.
7. President of the Egyptian General Scientific Society (Egyptian Scientific Union).
8. Chairman of the National Committee for Biological Sciences at the Academy.
9. Chairman of the AASTMT's State Awards Appreciation Committee and Mubarak Prize in Basic Sciences.
10. Member of the Egyptian Society for Scientific Culture and former president.
11. Member of the Egyptian Academy of Sciences and former president.
12. Founding member of the Egyptian Society of Parasitology and former president.

== Activities at the international level ==
1. Member and Fellow of the Islamic Academy of Sciences. (Amman - Jordan).
2. Member and Fellow of the African Academy of Sciences. (Nairobi - Kenya).
3. Member and Fellow of the Third World Academy of Sciences. (Trieste - Italy).
4. Honorary member of the Russian Entomology Society.
5. Distinguished Member of the American Entomological Society.
6. Fellow of the Royal Society of Entomology, London.
7. Member of the International Federation of Biological Sciences (Paris).
8. Member of the International Organization for Biological Pest Control (Paris).
9. Member of the Council of the International Union for the History of Science (Liège - Belgium).
10. Founding member of the International Center for Insect Ecology and Physiology (Nairobi - Kenya).
11. Honorary member of the Permanent Council of International Entomology Conferences and the International Plant Protection Council (Beijing - China).
12. Consultant to the International Organization for World Health on the subject of disease vectors.

== Death ==
Hafith spent nearly a month in a coma at Qasr Al-Aini Hospital, meters away from the Egyptian Scientific Institute, which witnessed a devastating fire a week before his death following clashes between demonstrators and members of the Egyptian army.

== Awards and honors ==
1. Mubarak Prize in Science (1999)
2. State Appreciation Prize in Science (1977)
3. Gold medal for his outstanding scientific efforts with a certificate of appreciation from the Academy of Scientific Research and Technology (1978)
4. Two certificates of merit from the USDA and the U.S. Naval Research Center for their pioneering research in agricultural and medicinal pests (1972, 1987)
5. Medal of Merit, first class (1978)
6. Medal of Sciences and Arts, first class (1981)

== Writings ==
=== Scientific ===
He has published many books in the field of biology, namely:

- General Zoology Textbook
- Animal anatomy textbook
- Foundations of Zoology
- Insects
- Prepared the section on zoology in the Arab Scientific Encyclopedia.

In addition, he has reviewed several translated reference books, including:

- History of biology
- Bee world

He also participated in translating the "Comoten" dictionary in the life sciences with Dr. Ahmed Ammar. The scientific periodicals filled with much of his research (163 papers) in the field of entomology and zoology, and he supervised many master's and doctoral theses in this field.

==== Linguistic ====
- The lectures he gave in the complex are:
- Arabic language in the service of biology. (Complex Journal C 43)
- Academy of the Arabic language and the language of science. (Complex Magazine C 53)
- The Arabic language in public and university education institutions and the means for promoting it (Complex Journal C 65)
- The Egyptian Society for Scientific Culture, its history and achievements (Complex Magazine C 75)
- Our specialized scientific dictionaries between originality and contemporary (Journal of Complex J)
- Translation between the past and the present and its role in transferring science to the Arabic language (Complex Journal C 78)
- The issue of Arabization in Egypt (Journal of Complex C 84)

It was published in the complex as well as the specialized scientific dictionaries that he participated in preparing:

- Opinions on the issue of higher and university Arabization
- The issue of Arabization in Egypt
- The Academy of the Arabic Language, a summary of its history and achievements
- My words are with immortals
