= Khaled Al-Karaki =

Jordanian politician and academic

- خالد الكركي
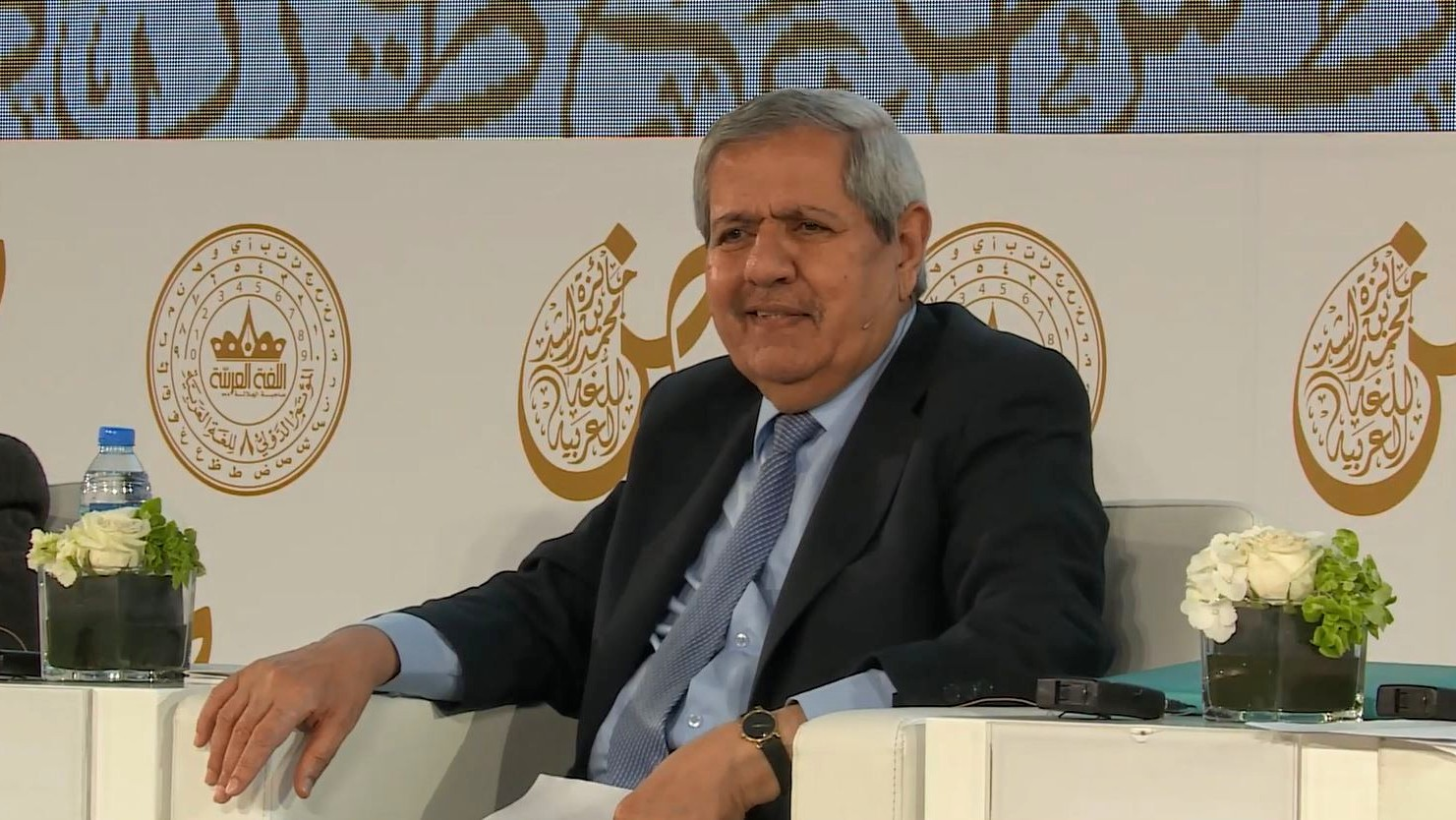
- Khaled Al-Karaki speaks at the International Council for the Arabic Language about winning the King Faisal Prize on May 22, 2020.

Minister of Culture
- In office December 1989 – October 1991

Minister of Culture and Higher Education
- In office October 1991 – November 1991

President of Jerash University
- In office 2002–2006

10 President of the University of Jordan
- In office May 31, 2007 – July 27, 2010
- Preceded by: Abd al-Rahim al-Hunayti
- Succeeded by: Adel al-Tuwaisi

Chair of The Royal Hashemite Court
- In office 1992–1993

Chair of The Royal Hashemite Court
- In office March 2011 – October 2011

Chair of the Jordan Academy of Arabic

Head of the Jordanian Writers Society
- In office 1985–1990

Chairman of the Jordanian Press Foundation
- In office 2000–2002

Personal details
- Born: خالد عبد العزيز سليمان الكركي; June 10, 1946 (age 80)
- Citizenship: Jordan
- Domestic partner: Insaf Qal'aji

Khaled Abdelaziz Sulaiman al-Karaki (born on June 10, 1946) is a Jordanian author, poet, academic and politician. He served as the Jordanian Minister of Culture (1989–91) and Deputy Prime Minister (1995–96 and 2010–11). He is a past president of Jerash University (2002–2006) and the University of Jordan (2007–2010). He currently chairs the Jordan Academy of Arabic.

== Personal life ==
He was born in 1946 in Al-Adnanya village in Al-Karak, south of Jordan. He was previously married to the writer Insaf Qala'aji.

== Education ==
He took his bachelor's degree in Arabic language from University of Jordan in 1969 and master's degree in Arabic language and literature from the same university in 1977. He received his PhD in philosophy from the Oriental Studies department of the University of Cambridge, Cambridge, UK, in 1980.

== Political career ==
Al-Karaki was a member of the advisory committee of the Ministry of Culture (1988). He then served as Minister of Culture (December 1989 - January 1991), Minister of Culture and Youth (January 1991 - June 1991), Minister of Culture and Information (June 1991 - October 1991) and Minister of Culture and Higher Education (October 1991 - November 1991). He was subsequently Deputy Prime Minister and Minister of Information (January 1995 - February 1996) and later Deputy Prime Minister and Minister of Education (July 2010 - January 2011). He was a Fellow of the Jordanian Senate (October 2011 – 2013).

During the 1990s, he served as political advisor to Hussein bin Talal, the King of the Hashemite Kingdom Of Jordan. He twice served as chair of The Royal Hashemite Court (1992–1993 and March–October 2011).

== Academic and literary career ==
Al-Karaki was a professor of Arabic at the University of Petra (1997–2000). He was the president of Jerash University (2002–2006). He served as president of the University of Jordan (May 2007 to July 2010), where he has also served as a Fellow of the Faculty Of Arts, Editor of the deanship of scientific research journal, Assistant dean of Faculty Of Arts For Administrative And Financial Affairs, Chief editor of cultural journal, and Dean of the deanship of students' affairs.

He is a Fellow of the Jordan Academy of Arabic, and has served as its Vice chair and Chair. He was a Fellow of the permanent office of the Arab association for comparative literature (Algeria 1984), the royal strategic studies center-Al Al-bet institute (from 2000), and the Jordanian Writers Society.

He has served as head of the Jordanian Writers Society (1985-1990), Chairman of Jordanian Press Foundation (Al-Rai newspaper; 2000-2002), and deputy chair of the board of trustees of the Al-Albeit Foundation for Islamic Thought (from 2000).

== Awards ==
He received the King Hussein Medal of Excellence-First class.
