= Department of Tamil Development and Information =

Government department of Tamil Nadu state, India

Department of Tamil Development and Information (Tamil Nadu)

Agency overview
- Formed: Printing and stationery (1831)
- Jurisdiction: Tamil Nadu
- Headquarters: Chennai
- Minister responsible: Rajmohan Arumugam, Minister of Tamil Development and Information Department
- Agency executive: R. Selvaraj, IAS, Secretary, Tamil Development and Information
- Parent agency: Government of Tamil Nadu
- Website: Tamil Development and Information Department

The Department of Tamil Development and Information is one of the departments of Government of Tamil Nadu. The department consists of three directorates: Tamil development–responsible for development of Tamil language; information and publicity–responsible for public relations; stationery and printing–responsible for government printing.

== Sub-divisions ==
The department consists of three sub-divisions: Tamil development, information and publicity; stationery and printing.

=== Tamil development ===
Tamil is the widely spoken and official language of the state. It is one of the longest-surviving classical languages in the world. The Tamil development department is responsible for the development of the language through the directorate of Tamil development, administration of educational institutes, translation of works and institution of literature awards. The following educational and research institutes function under the department:

- Central Institute of Classical Tamil, Chennai
- International Institute of Tamil Studies, Chennai
- Tamil University, Thanjavur
- World Tamil Sangam, Madurai

=== Information and publicity ===
The information and publicity department is responsible for public relations management, government advertising, conducting government functions, administration of memorials, management of cable and television networks, welfare of journalist and film workers. The department also manages the following institutes and boards:

- M.G.R. Government Film and Television Training Institute
- Journalist Welfare Board
- Film Workers Welfare Board
- State Information Centre, Chennai

=== Printing and stationery ===
Printing department was established on 17 December 1831 at Fort St. George. The printing and stationery department is responsible for all government related printing activity and maintains seven printing presses and a stationery office in Chennai. Printing paper is manufactured by government owned Tamil Nadu Newsprint and Papers Limited.

== See also ==
- Government of Tamil Nadu
- Tamil Nadu Government's Departments
