= Timeline of the Iraqi insurgency (2018) =

This is a timeline of events during the Islamic State insurgency in Iraq (2017–present) in 2018.

== Chronology ==
=== January–April ===
Between January and February 2018, Iraqi security forces and Peshmerga clashed with the White Flags around parts of the Kirkuk and Saladin governorates for control of oil fields which the Iraqi government claims the group's priority is. The Iraqi government said in the clashes the composition of the White Flag's fighters are IS members and individuals linked to the Kurdish mafia, the government also alleges that the Kurdistan Region allowed oil theft to occur in the area while it was under their control and enabled IS for their own interests.

In March 2018, in two separate attacks IS reportedly killed 10 individuals including a pro-government Sunni tribal Sheikh along with his son and guests at his house in the town of Al-Shirqat south of Mosul, in the other attack IS killed 5 individuals from the same family whom were Iraqi Turkmen and Shia at a fake checkpoint set up by the group posing as Iraqi security forces.

- 22 March 2018 – Six individuals and 15 others were at a checkpoint set up by IS the group killed six individuals and injured 15 others from the Iraqi Turkmen minority on their way to Erbil from Baghdad between Tuz Khurmato and Daquq to celebrate Nowruz. The attack was condemned by Turkey and Zowaa claimed one of their MPs was present during the attack but managed to escape unharmed.
- 2 April 2018 – PMF Major General named Ali Khalifa was killed in an operation around Tuz Khurmato and Kirkuk against IS and the White Flags.

=== June–September ===
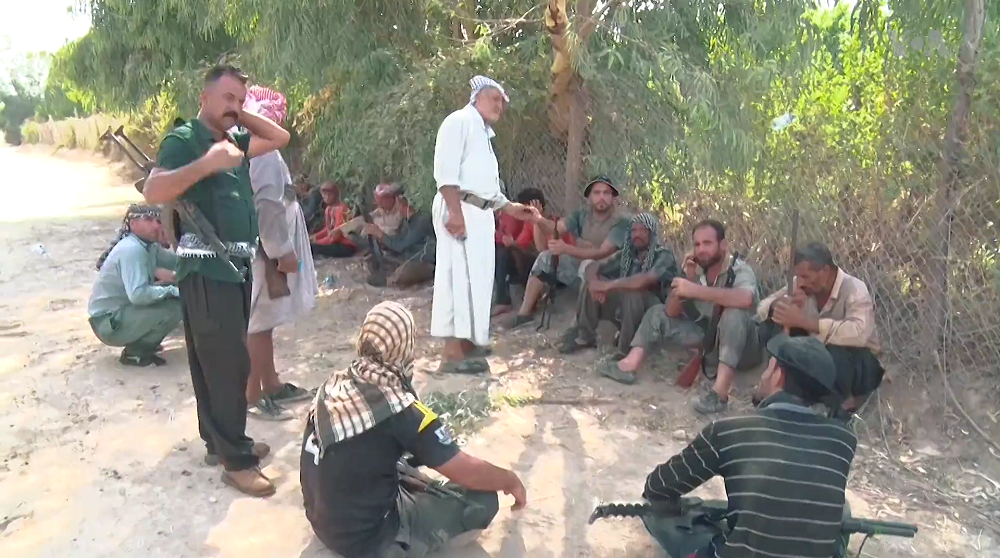
Fighters of a self-defense group in northeastern Iraq in June 2018. IS still has a presence in remote areas of the country, often attacking small villages and forcing the locals to fight or flee.

- 8 June 2018 – The Government of Canada announced that it will suspend Canadian support for Peshmerga and work exclusively with the Iraqi government, in a statement a Canadian military official said "We have changed … partners," a Canadian General told reporters about the shift in support "Training with the Peshmerga was ceased when it was no longer of any value in terms of the battle against Da’esh [IS]."
- In July 2018, the Iraqi Army, Popular Mobilization Forces and Peshmerga launched Operation "Vengeance for the Martyrs" to destroy ISIL remnants in Diyala and Kirkuk Governorates, supported by the Iraqi Air Force and US-led coalition.
- 11 July 2018 – Canadian Prime Minister Justin Trudeau announced that Canada would lead a NATO mission to Iraq with European allies to send 250 Canadian soldiers to Baghdad, 50 will be doing the actual training while the other 125 will be doing force protection and another 20 will help run Canadian headquarters in Baghdad.
- 4 August 2018 – Chairman of the Iraqi Baath Party, Izzat Ibrahim al-Douri in a statement broadcast on Facebook in commemoration of the anniversary of the Baath Party called on Iraqis to continue fighting the Iraqi government and allied Iranian backed groups, calling them Safavids. He also called on Saudi Arabia to intervene against Iran's influence in Iraq and praised the country. Additionally, he condemned the battle of Mosul and other battles that led up to it and claimed that Haidar al-Abadi had ordered the destruction of the cities of Ramadi, Tikrit, Fallujah and others.
- 6 September 2018 – Mortar fire was reported near the US embassy in Baghdad's Green Zone from a neighborhood controlled by the PMF's component Asa'ib Ahl al-Haq, a Shia paramilitary group backed by Iran. The group fired 120mm mortars, and in response the embassy did take security measures. No casualties or injuries were reported.
- 26 September 2018 – An Iraqi commander with the PMF's 21st Brigade survived an IS assassination attempt that included the use of a roadside IED in the Mutaibija region of Saladin. While he did survive, three of his guards were reported wounded. IS reportedly continues to carry out sporadic clashes with its campaign compared to the 2013 offensive, which eventually led to the 2013–2017 war.

=== October ===
- 1 October 2018 – A roadside bomb planted by IS in the Kirkuk Governorate near Hawija killed an Iraqi police officer and wounded two others. On the same day, IS published photos of a night raid in the village of Daquq, in the southern part of the Kirkuk Governorate, showing fighters burning down the house of a village elder cooperating with the Iraqi government. IS also carried out a series of attacks targeting electrical facilities to sabotage the electrical grid to cutoff electricity for the Iraqi military and allied forces around Kirkuk. IS fighters also planted explosives around several transmission towers, and the destruction of the towers caused several blackouts in Hawija and Kirkuk.
- 3 October 2018 – The Government of Germany announced a planned extension of its military involvement in Iraq for one year to combat IS but will end air reconnaissance missions by 31 October 2019. On the same day unknown gunmen, believed to be IS, killed an individual by driving up to them in a car and opening fire, the targeted individual reportedly died at the scene as a result of the gunshot wounds.
- 4 October 2018 – An operation against IS was started by the Iraqi military along with the military forces of France and the United States under the CJTF-OIR coalition in the Anbar Governorate around the city of Qaim and the Syrian border where IS continues to operate and maintain a strong and large presence. During the operation IS claimed to thwart an American-led assault near the Syrian border and also claimed to have killed 3 US soldiers and wounded 4 others in the clashes, the US military has not confirmed or denied the claimed losses.
- 5 October 2018 – US-led coalition planes bombed an IS position in the village of Kushaf near the Tigris river in the Kirkuk Governorate, reportedly killing 6 IS members. IS detonated a roadside bomb, killing an oil employee and injuring 11 others in a bus in Baiji in the Saladin Governorate. In a separate attack in Fallujah in the Anbar Governorate, IS detonated a car bomb injuring an Iraqi policeman and 3 others. IS released a video from Kirkuk, showing its fighters planting IEDs and carrying out ambushes or raids on Iraqi outposts. The video also claimed that the group has killed and injured more than 927 government forces since 2017 in the Kirkuk region, and in the end video the group executed several individuals in remote areas and assassinated two individuals cooperating with the Iraqi government at their houses.
- 7 October 2018 – IS claimed responsibility for the detonation of an explosive device in the Kadhimiya neighborhood of Baghdad that resulted in the death and injury of 12 Shiites.
- 8 October 2018 – Iraq's interior minister Qasim al-Araji posted a video on his Facebook page which claimed that an unnamed extremist group is behind the murder of 22-year-old Iraqi model Tara Fares. Fares, who won Miss Baghdad in 2015, was shot and killed while driving her car in Baghdad in September. On the same day, IS militants shot dead 2 Iraqi Policemen at a checkpoint near Mosul, and fled the scene afterwards.
- 9 October 2018 – 4 PMF militia fighters were killed in an attack by IS in the Hit district of Al Anbar Governorate.
- 10 October 2018 – At least 10 Iraqi security forces were killed when IS insurgents attacked a gas field on the western part of Al Anbar Governorate.
- 16 October 2018 – An Iraqi policeman was killed while 2 others were injured fighting with IS in western Kirkuk. On the same day Iraqi Federal forces detained a Kurdish reporter covering news about strikes in Tuz Khurmatu in anniversary of the Iraqi takeover of Kirkuk.
- 17 October 2018 – An unofficial IS linked media outlet claimed the death of 6 Badr Organization militia fighters in Diyala as the result of IS IED.
- 20 October 2018 – An explosive device detonated at a mosque in the Zubeir district of Basra, no group has claimed responsibility nor were any casualties or injuries reported.
- 23 October 2018 – A car bomb went off in the Qayyara district of Mosul killing 6 individuals and leaving 30 injured. No group has claimed responsibility for the bombing; however, Iraqi officials have accused IS of carrying out the attack.
- 24 October 2018 – Turkish foreign minister Mevlüt Çavuşoğlu stated that Turkey would support the Iraqi government in reconstruction and in training the Iraqi military as part of a NATO mission saying, "Iraq's reconstruction is important. We (Turkey) are the most generous country. We pledged $5 billion loan [for Iraq]. Our firms will benefit from this money with investment, trade and by undertaking projects [there]" adding "Now, as NATO, we will train Iraqi security forces".
- 26 October 2018 – Five individuals were killed in Al-Ba'aj in the Nineveh Governorate west of Mosul after being abducted by IS for cooperating with the Iraqi military by gathering information about the group.
- 28 October 2018 – South Korea sent a shipment of 6 KAI T-50 Golden Eagle fighter jets, the Iraqi Ministry of Defense said this was the third shipment of fighters jets provided by South Korea. On the same day the Iraqi military accidentally shelled a village in the Diyala Governorate due to suspicion of IS presence. No casualties were reported. This is reportedly the second such incident in the month, with the last incident happening days before.
- 29 October 2018 – In response to a successful counter-attack by IS against the Syrian Democratic Forces along the Iraqi-Syrian border the Iraqi government deployed PMU militiamen along the border to reinforce sensitive positions in fears of a potential IS cross-border infiltration. On the same day Italy announced a planned end to military operations in Iraq in support of both the Kurdistan Regional Government and Iraqi Government by the spring of 2019.
- 30 October 2018 – 2 Shiite pilgrims were killed and another injured in an IS attack on an Arbaeen celebration in the town of Khanaqin in the Diyala Governorate, after the explosion police reportedly attempted to defuse a device.
- 31 October 2018 – A man was killed and his son was injured in a suspected IS attack near a shrine in the town of Makhmur, Iraq.

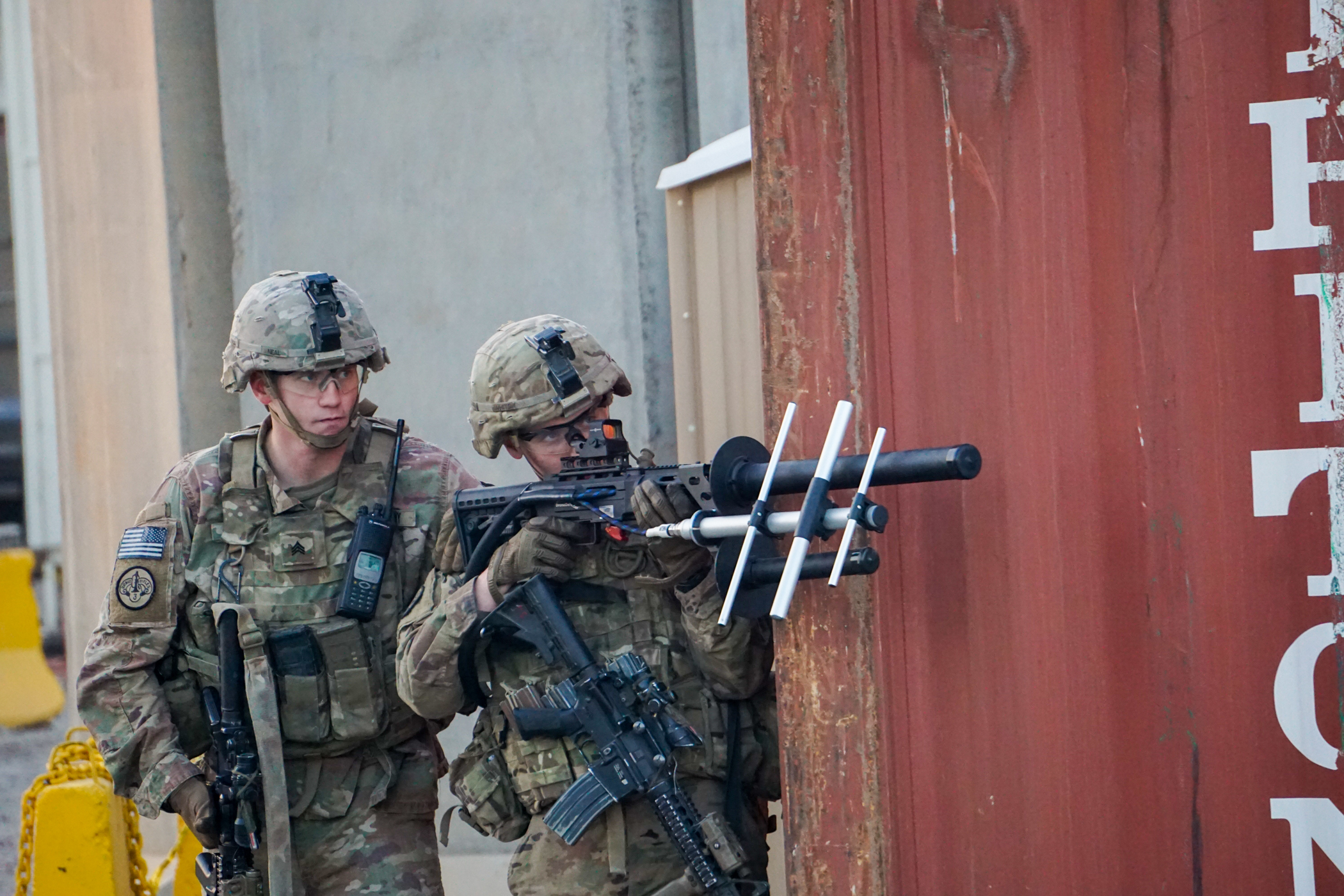
1st Squadron, 3rd Cavalry Regiment of the US Army drill with the Battelle Drone Defender in Iraq, 30 October 2018. US troops anticipate IS units deploying drones during reconnaissance or attacks

=== November ===
- 1 November 2018 – A land mine struck a vehicle of a governor near Baiji, two of his bodyguards were injured while the governor escaped unscathed. Another bomb targeting a military patrol exploded in West Mosul killing a soldier and injuring at least 7 more, IS was most likely behind the attack. On the same day clashes occurred between Arab and Kurdish farmers in Daquq due to Arab farmers asking Kurdish farmers to leave the area, while the Kurdish claimed the area was theirs.
- 2 November 2018 – IS claimed to have killed a French soldier via the Amaq Agency whom was cooperating with Peshmerga in a combined operation in the village of Balkanah in the Tuz Khurmato district of the Kirkuk Governorate, IS published the claims in Arabic and French, the French military denied the claim via Twitter. On the same day IS began attempted to infiltrate Iraq from Syria in Rabii'a sub district 130 kilometers west of Mosul. In the clashes 4 Iraqi soldiers & 2 IS fighters were killed near Iraqi border.
- 4 November 2018 – A series of bombings struck several different areas in the capital of Iraq, Baghdad, killing at least 7 people and injuring an additional 14. IS claimed responsibility for the bombings.
- 8 November 2018 – A car bomb exploded near a restaurant in the Iraqi city of Mosul, killing at least 4 people and injuring 12 according to Iraqi officials. IS was most likely behind the attack.
- 9 November 2018 – 3 civilians were killed in an armed attack by IS in a village located near southern Mosul.
- 11 November 2018 – 9 people including 8 civilians and a tribal fighter were killed when IS attacked a house of a fighter of the Tribal Mobilization Forces near the Al-Karmah area in Iraq.
- 12 November 2018 – 2 people were captured including a policeman and a civilian and then executed by Islamic State militants in a village in the southern Kirkuk Governorate.
- 15 November 2018 – A bomb detonated while a police vehicle was travelling from Mosul to a nearby village, leaving 2 civilians dead and a policeman injured. IS was most likely behind the attack.
- 18 November 2018 – A car bomb detonated in the city of Tikrit, killing 5 civilians and injuring 16 others. IS claimed responsibility for the attack.
- 19 November 2018 – A bomb and shooting attack on a police patrol killed an officer and wounded 4 others in the area of the Khanaqin. No group claimed responsibility, but IS was most likely behind the blast.
- 22 November 2018 – A roadside bomb detonated near a bus in a town near Mosul, killing 4 schoolchildren and injuring 7 others. No group claimed responsibility, but the attack was blamed on IS. That same day, 2 paramilitary soldiers were killed and 4 others wounded when their vehicle ran over a landmine near the Badush Dam. The landmine had been planted by IS.

=== December ===
- 6 December 2018 – Unknown gunmen assassinated a commander affiliated Muqtada al-Sadr's Peace Companies.
- 15 December 2018 – A coalition airstrike conducted by a B1 Lancer heavy bomber targeting a tunnel entrance West of Mosul in the Atshana Mountains killed 4 IS fighters.

== See also ==
- Timeline of the Islamic State (2018)
