= Timeline of the Islamic State (2018) =

This is a timeline of Islamic State-related incidents in 2018.

== Timeline ==
=== January 2018 ===
- Members of ISIS in the Sinai "declared war" on Hamas, demanding Hamas release ISIS militants held in Gaza's prisons.
- On 15 January, two suicide bombings took place at al-Tayaran Square of Baghdad, killing 38 people and injuring more than 105 others. IS claimed responsibility.
- On 24 January, IS affiliated forces attacked the Save the Children office, a global charity organization, in Jalalabad, Afghanistan. The assailants killed five people and injured 24 others. The assailants were killed in the attack following a 10-hour siege.

=== March 2018 ===
- On 21 March, a suicide bomber blew himself up near Kabul University in Kabul, Afghanistan. The bomber killed 29 people and wounded 52 others while walking among a group of pedestrians. IS claimed responsibility for the attack.
- On 24 March, a 26-year-old man named Redouane Lakdim shot at a group of off-duty police officers and shot dead one man while attempting to hijack a car in Carcassonne, France. Lakdim then attacked a Super U supermarket in Trèbes, France where Lakdim shot and killed two people upon entering the store. He then took the rest of the civilians inside the supermarket hostage. Police were able to negotiate with Lakdim to release the hostages, with one police officer, Arnaud Beltrame, exchanging places with the final hostage. Following an attempted disarmament of Lakdim by Beltrame, Lakdim killed the officer, but was killed himself by French police in the following assault. Lakdim claimed allegiance to IS and had been on the terrorist watchlist since 2014.

=== April 2018 ===
- On 12 April, 25 people were killed and 18 wounded when explosives exploded at a funeral for Sunni Muslim tribal fighters in the village of Asdira near the northern Iraqi town of Al-Shirqat. IS claimed responsibility.
- On 22 April, a suicide bomber detonated himself in Kabul, Afghanistan. The bomber targeted an ID distribution center where citizens were registering to vote for the upcoming election. The bomber killed 57 people and wounded approximately 120 others. Six more people were killed due to a roadside bomb at another voting center bringing the total deaths to 63. IS claimed responsibility for the attacks.
- On 30 April, a double suicide bombing occurred in Kabul, Afghanistan. The first suicide bomber detonated himself near the National Directorate of Security. The second bomber detonated himself 30 minutes later when medical workers and journalists arrived. The attacks claimed 29 lives total, including nine journalists and wounded 49 others. IS claimed responsibility for the attack.

=== May 2018 ===
- On 12 May, a knife-wielding man attacked a group of bystanders in the opera district in Paris, France. The attack left one person dead and injured four others while the assailant was killed shot dead by the police. IS claimed responsibility for the attack.
- On 14 May, a suicide bomber, who IS claimed responsibility for, detonated himself in Surabaya, Indonesia. The attack occurred outside a police station and killed at least 10 people as well as injuring four officers and six civilians.

=== June 2018 ===
- On 17 June, a suicide bomber detonated himself in the Afghan province of Nangarhar. The bomber killed 36 and wounded 65 others on the second day of Eid al-Fitre, which marks the end of Ramadan for the Muslim community. Though the bomber did not claim allegiance to IS, the terrorist organization took responsibility for his action.

=== July 2018 ===
- On 25 July, a series of suicide bombings took place around the city of Sweida, Syria in the Al-Suwaidaa province. The suicide bombings killed 255 people and injured hundreds more as IS claimed responsibility for the attack.

=== August 2018 ===
- On 15 August, a suicide bomber attacked a tuition center where students were preparing for university exams in Kabul, Afghanistan. The bomber killed 48 young men and women in the center as well as injured at least 67 others. IS claimed responsibility for the attack.

=== September 2018 ===
- On 5 September, two bombings occurred Kabul Afghanistan. The suicide bomber attacked a wrestling club in a heavily Shia neighborhood which was followed by a car bomb to target journalists and medical personnel. These two bombs killed approximately 30 people, including two journalists and injured approximately 96 others. IS claimed responsibility for the attacks.

=== October 2018 ===
- On 23 October, a car bomb exploded near a restaurant and market area in Mosul, Iraq. The attack killed at least six people and injured approximately 30 others. Though IS did not claim direct responsibility for the attack, the top military commander in Iraq, Mosul Major-General Najim al-Jabouri, stated using the alternate term for IS - Daesh -, as he was positive it was IS who carried out the attack.

=== November 2018 ===
- On 9 November, a man named Hassan Khalif Shire Ali went on a stabbing spree in Melbourne Australia. The attack took place on a crowded Melbourne street where he attacked and killed a police officer with a knife and light bulb. The attacker also injured two other bystanders until he was eventually killed by law enforcement. The perpetrator supported IS and IS also took responsibility for the attack.

=== December 2018 ===
- On 25 December, a car bomb exploded in Tal Afar, Iraq. The attack killed two people and wounded 11 with IS claiming responsibility for the casualties. Tal Afar was a previous stronghold of IS until it was taken back by Iraqi security forces in August 2017.
