= Insaf Qal'aji =

Insaf Qal'aji (Arabic: إنصاف قلعيجي; born 1946) is a Jordanian short story writer of Palestinian descent.

Born in Haifa, Qal'aji graduated from the University of Jordan, at which she had studied Arabic, in 1969; she later received a master's degree from the School of Oriental and African Studies at the University of London. Her first collection of short stories, Sorrow Has Remnants of Joy, appeared in 1987. Her work has been anthologized in English. She was at one time married to the academic Khaled al-Karaki.
