= Romanization of Kurdish =

Romanization of the Sorani Kurdish alphabet

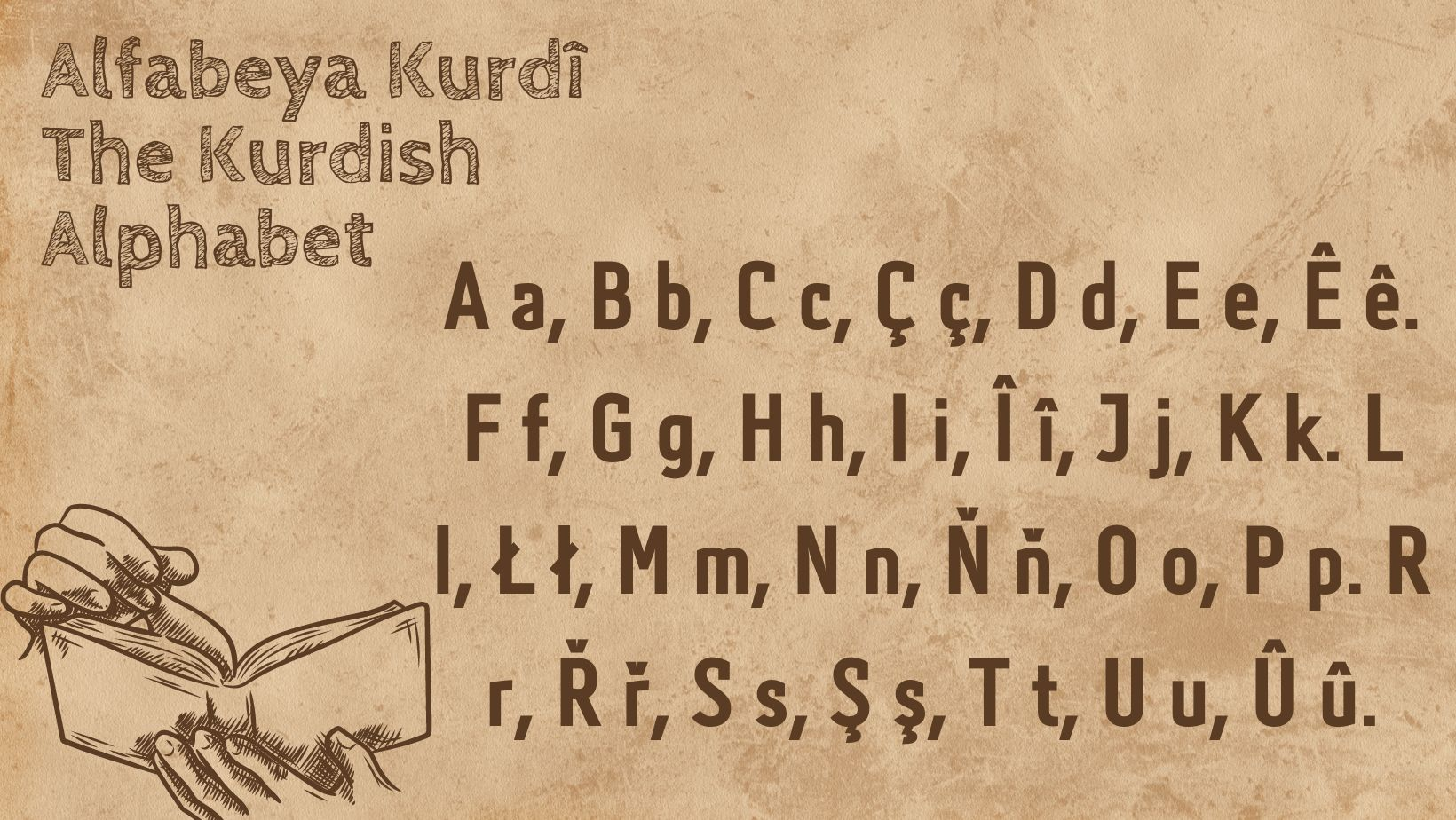
Latin letters of Kurdish currently in use

The romanization of Kurdish language (Note: Kurdish: لاتینی کوردی, Latînî Kurdî) is the practice of transcribing the Kurdish, traditionally written in both Arabic and Latin scripts, into a standardized Latin alphabet. The development of Kurdish romanization systems supports the need for digital communication, linguistic research, and accessibility for Kurdish speakers and Kurdish speakers in diaspora communities. These systems strive to maintain phonetic precision and consistency across the diverse Kurdish dialects.

== Historical background ==
Efforts to standardize Kurdish in a Latin-based script began in the 20th century, driven by a desire to create a unified writing system that could bridge dialectal differences and promote a unified Kurdish identity. The adaptation of the Latin script for Kurdish was influenced by its use in other Arabic, Turkic and Iranian languages in the region, which were also transitioning away from Arabic scripts at the time.

Mîr Celadet Bedirxan, a Kurdish writer, linguist and diplomat, was the first to bring the Latin script to the Middle East and use it for Kurdish, alongside the Arabic script since the 1920–1930s, this new Latin script became known as Hawar.

== Kurdish Academy romanization system ==
The Kurdish Academy system is one of the most widely used romanization systems for Kurdish. It emphasizes phonetic accuracy, utilizing Latin characters with diacritics to represent unique Kurdish phonology. This system is particularly useful for linguistic and educational purposes, providing clear guidelines on how to pronounce Kurdish words accurately.

The following table illustrates the transcription of selected Kurdish sounds into Latin script according to the Kurdish Romanization system, showing the corresponding Arabic script, phonetic sounds, and example words for each letter.

Kurdish romanization
| Romanization (Hawar generally considered) | Arabic Script (Sorani Kurdish) | Sound | Example Word |
|---|---|---|---|
| a | ئ | /æ/ | ئاوارە (aware - Refugee) |
| a (Note: Long vowel) | ا | /ɑ/ | باران (baran - Rain) |
| b | ب | /b/ | بەفر (befir - Snow) |
| c | ج | /ʤ/ | جاران (caran - Times) |
| ç | چ | /ʧ/ | چاو (çaw - Eye) |
| d | د | /d/ | دەنگ (deng - Sound) |
| 'e | ع | /ʕ/ | عەشیرەت ('eşîret - Tribe) |
| e (Note: Short vowel) | ە | /e/ | ئەمە (eme - This) |
| ê | ێ | /ɛ/ | گوێ (giwê - Ear) |
| f | ف | /f/ | فڕین (fiřîn - To fly) |
| g | گ | /ɡ/ | گەرمی (germî - Warmth) |
| h | ھ | /h/ | ھەزار (hezar - Thousand) |
| ĥ (Note: Rarely used) | ح | /ħ/ | حەوت (ĥewit - Seven) |
| i (Note: Biziroke (Consonant) in Kurdish, exists and is used only in the Kurmanji and Latin script, and has no appearance in Central Kurdish) | 'بزرۆکە' | /i/ | ئاگر (agir -Fire) |
| î | ی | /iː/ | چیرۆک (çîrok - Tale) |
| j | ژ | /ʒ/ | ژمارە (jimare - Number) |
| k | ک | /k/ | کوردی (Kurdî - Kurdish) |
| ll or ł | ڵ | /ɫ/ | لێڵ (lêll or lêł - Blurry) |
| l | ل | /l/ | لەیلا (leyla - Leyla) (Note: Common Middle Eastern name) |
| m | م | /m/ | مەزن (mezin - Big) |
| n | ن | /n/ | نەورۆز (newroz - Kurdish new year) |
| o | ۆ | /o/ | خۆشی (xoşî - Happiness) |
| p | پ | /p/ | پڕ (př - Full) |
| q | ق | /q/ | قسە (qise - Speech) |
| r | ر | /ɾ/ | کرم (kirim - Earthworm) |
| s | س | /s/ | سەرکەوتن (serkewtin - Victory) |
| ş | ش | /ʃ/ | شاخ (şax - Mountain) |
| t | ت | /t/ | تەمەن (temen - Age) |
| u | و | /ʊ/ | کوڕ (kuř - Boy) |
| û | وو | /uː/ | بەستوو (bestû - Icy) |
| v | ڤ | /v/ | ڤەداندەر (vedander - Creator) |
| w | و | /w/ | وەرگرتن (wergirtin - To take) |
| x | خ | /x/ | خاک (xak - Land) |
| y | ی | /j/ | یار (yar - Lover) |
| z | ز | /z/ | زەرد (zerd - Yellow) |

== Regional variations ==
Due to the variety of Kurdish dialects, regional adaptations of romanization exist, reflecting pronunciation differences. This has led to some differences in preferred romanized forms across regions, as various linguistic institutions seek to adapt romanization practices that best reflect their local dialect.

== Practical applications ==
The use of romanized Kurdish is prevalent in digital communication, especially within Kurdish diaspora communities, where Latin-based keyboards are more accessible. Additionally, the UK government has developed a practical romanization system for administrative purposes, designed to simplify Kurdish transcription without the use of diacritics.

== See also ==
- Romanization of Arabic
- Romanization of Persian
- Kurdish Academy
