= Death of Rasha al-Hassan =

2018 death of Iraqi beautician

Rasha al-Hassan (died August 23, 2018) was an Iraqi beautician and entrepreneur. She was the founder of the Viola center for Iraqi Medical Beauty in Baghdad, Iraq. al-Hassan was named one of Iraq's "Thursday victims" when her 2018 death was connected to that of other prominent Iraqi women. al-Hassan's death raised international attention to the deaths of Iraqi women and was widely speculated to be part of a conspiracy against Iraqi women's empowerment and the beauty industry. Two of the "Thursday victims" deaths were undisputedly the result of targeted assassinations. The circumstances around al-Hassan's death were less certain after acting Iraqi prime minister Haider al-Abadi openly questioned official reports of her death by natural causes.

== Background ==
Rasha al-Hassan died on August 23, 2018. Described as a well known Iraqi beauty entrepreneur and founder of Baghdad's Viola center for Iraqi Medical Beauty, al-Hassan died unexpectedly after sharing good tidings on social media to her followers in honor of the start of the Eid al-Adha holiday. In addition to Viola Beauty, al-Hassan reportedly owned a cafe for women in Baghdad. She was in her thirties and the mother of three children.

Her death was first announced by the Viola Center for Medical Aesthetics Facebook page, citing the cause as "heart palpitations" or a heart attack. Shortly after, al-Hassan's death was publicly announced by the Iraqi health ministry, stating that she had died in hospital. The ministry disclosed her body was taken by security to a government facility for a forensic autopsy to determine a cause of death.

=== Reaction ===
The ministry's announcement, paired with the conflicting account provided by al-Hassan's business Facebook page caused Iraqi media and civil society to speculate widely about the actual circumstances of her death. Reports of al-Hassan dying of poisoning or suffocation were reported in the local media. Rumors were heightened in the country as beauticians were previously unable to practice openly in the aftermath of the 2003 invasion, and where some continued to fear for their safety due to extremism.

al-Hassan's death was soon connected to the unexpected August 16, 2018, death of Rafif al-Yasiri, a prominent Iraqi cosmetic surgeon and influencer, known as "Iraq's Barbie". Both deaths occurred at home, causing many in the local media and civil society to speculate that they were politically motivated, as both women were visible members of the Iraqi beauty industry.

Iraqi MP Faiq al-Sheikh Ali publicly connected the two women's deaths to wider violence against women in the country on Twitter, “After the pilots, doctors, university professors and others, it is beauty centers turn now, from Rafeef to Rasha,” suggesting the killers were enemies of beauty. In the weeks after al-Hassan's death, rumors continued to circulate about the cause, with critics highlighting the circumstances that al-Yasiri and al-Hasan's deaths occurred only a week apart. The Iraqi health ministry later indicated both al-Yasiri and al-Hassan's deaths were due to natural causes.

=== Deaths of al-Ali and al-Fares ===
One month after al-Hassan's death, in September, women's rights campaigner Suʽad al-ʽAli was killed by gunshot in the Iraqi city of Basra. Three days later, Tara Fares, an Iraqi model and influencer was publicly assassinated in Baghdad. As attention heightened around the deaths of the women and after receiving death threats, Miss Iraq 2015 Shimaa Qasim Abdulrahman fled the country for her safety.

=== Controversy ===
Following weeks of considerable public speculation into the cause of death of al-Hassan and al-Yasiri, after Fares's death, the deaths of the four prominent women were quickly connected as politically and socially motivated. Described as the "Thursday victims", al-Hassan's and al-Yasiri's deaths were publicly declared as murder by media outlets and civil society organizations. Campaigners suggested the deaths were due to the outspoken nature of the women, and in the case of al-Yasiri, Fares and al-Hassan, their connection to the beauty industry.

The concerns were further amplified by acting Iraqi prime minister, Haider al-Abadi, who declared the deaths of the four women to be not random and claimed he would use the power of the interior ministry to hold the attackers accountable. His remarks were made despite official reports into al-Hassan's and al-Yasiri's deaths declaring them to be from natural causes.

Concerns for the safety of beauticians were heightened when a beauty shop owner in Basra was killed in October 2018.
