= Order of Al-Hussein for Distinguished Contributions =

the Order of Al-Hussein for Distinguished Contribution وسام الحسين للعطاء المميز

Awarded by King of the Hashemite Kingdom of Jordan
- Type: Order
- Established: March 29, 1997
- Country: Jordan
- Eligibility: Distinguished figures who have made exceptional contributions or notable services
- Status: Currently awarded
- Founder: Hussein bin Talal
- Sovereign: Abdullah II bin Al-Hussein
- Grades: First Class (Supreme); Second Class
- Ribbon of Al-Hussein Decoration for Distinguished Giving

The Order of Al-Hussein for Distinguished Contributions (وسام الحسين للعطاء المميز) is a high-ranking royal Jordanian medal established on March 29, 1997, by the Jordanian king. It is awarded to prominent figures who have provided outstanding services or exceptional contributions. The decoration is named after the Jordanian king, Hussein bin Talal.

== History ==
The Order of Al-Hussein was established on March 29, 1997, by decree of the then-Jordanian king, Hussein bin Talal, to honor distinguished individuals who have rendered notable services or contributions.

== Grades of the decoration ==
The Order of Al-Hussein for Distinguished Contributions is composed of two grades only:

Supreme First Class (Al-Darajah Al-Ula Al-Ulya)	Second Class (Al-Darajah Al-Thaniyah)
Awarded for extraordinary achievements or contributions of national or international significance.	Given to individuals or organizations for significant contributions within their field of expertise.

== Notable recipients ==
- Widad Kawar: Awarded the first degree. She is a prominent figure in preserving Palestinian and Jordanian heritage and the founder of the Tiraz Centre, which focuses on cultural heritage preservation.
- Haifa Najjar: Received the first degree in 2001. She is a former minister of culture and a distinguished academic figure in Jordan.
- Muhanna Al-Dura: Received the first degree in 2008. He was a pioneering Jordanian artist and is considered the father of modern art in Jordan.
- Samiha Khrais: Awarded the second degree in 2015. She is a renowned Jordanian novelist and writer, celebrated for her contributions to literature.
- Abdulkareem Khalefah: First Class in 2000.
- Mohammad Thneibat: Recognized for his efforts in developing Jordan's education sector, he received this distinction on Jordan's Independence Day celebration in 2015.
- Professor Ali Al Ghzawi: Honored in 2017 for his contributions to scientific research and higher education.
- Said Darwazeh – Although primarily associated with the Order of Independence, he has been involved in noteworthy contributions to the pharmaceutical industry, which aligns with the caliber of honorees in this category.
