= Suʽad al-ʽAli =

Iraqi human rights activist (died 2018)

- سعاد العلي
- Born: c 1972; Iraq
- Died: September 25, 2018, age 46; Al-Abbasiyah district, Basra, Iraq
- Cause of death: Assassination by gunshot
- Other name: Soad al-Ali
- Organization: al-Weed al-Alaiami For Human Rights
- Known for: Human rights campaigner, protest organizer
- Children: 4

Suʽad al-ʽAli (Arabic: سعاد العلي, c. 1972 – 25 September 2018) was an Iraqi human rights campaigner. She was the president of al-Wid al-Alami For Human Rights, an Iraqi non-governmental organisation focused on the rights of women and children. She was assassinated in the city of Basra, Iraq, on September 25, 2018. Her murder remains unsolved.

== Background ==
Al-ʽAli was a leader of the 2018 protests in the city of Basra against corruption and economic, political and social problems. Su’ad Al-Ali was a strong advocate of women’s and children’s rights. She was the head of Al-Weed Al-Alaiami - an Iraqi NGO concentrating on "women's rights and demands” and "children's rights and many activities for the revival of childhood", according to the Gulf Centre for Human Rights.

=== Death ===
According to Frontline Defenders, "On 25 September at 3:30 p.m., in the Al-Abbasiyah district in the city centre of Basra, an unidentified man shot Su’ad Al-Ali in the back of her head while she was getting into her car." A video showing her killing by unknown attackers was posted online and reported by the BBC. Al-Ali was 46 years old and was survived by her four children.

ʽAli al-Bayati from the Iraqi High Commission for Human Rights (IHCHR) condemned the killing of Al-ʽAli, and called on the Iraqi government to protect civil society organisations and human rights activists.

=== Aftermath ===
Two days after Al-Ali's assassination, model and influencer Tara Fares was killed in Baghdad while waiting in a car. Their deaths were quickly connected to those of Rafif al-Yasiri and Rasha al-Hassan, prominent Baghdad beauticians who died in unclear circumstances the month previously. The women did not have any connection to one another in life, but their deaths were linked to suggesting fears of a possible conspiracy against Iraqi women.

== See also ==
- Rafif al-Yasiri, Rasha al-Hassan and Tara Fares, prominent Iraqi women who died around the same time as al-'Ali and were speculatively linked together as the "Thursday victims" despite the women having little in common with one another.
- 2015–2018 Iraqi protests
- Violence against women in Iraq
- Reham Yacoub, Iraqi woman activist killed in Basra in 2020
