= Kurdish Academy =

- Formation: 1971; reopened in 2007
- Purpose: Regulatory body of the Kurdish language
- Headquarters: Erbil, Iraqi Kurdistan
- President: Abdolfattah Ali Borani
- Website: https://gov.krd/ka-en/

The Kurdish Academy (Kurdish: ئەکادیمیای کوردی, romanized: Ekadîmiyay Kurdî) is an institution mandated by the Kurdistan Regional Government, dealing with all issues related to the Kurdish language within Kurdistan Region.

== Gallery ==
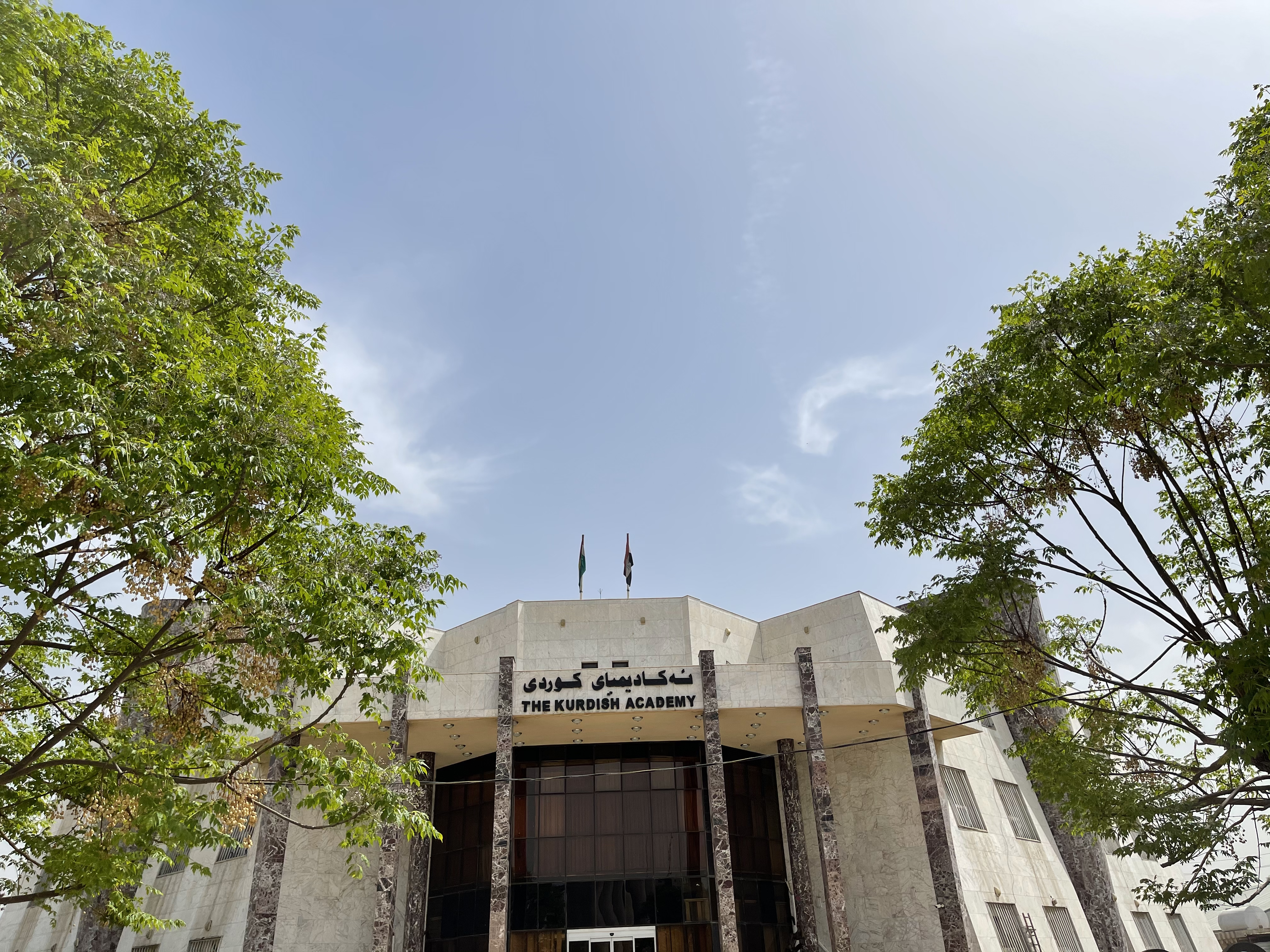
Front entrance

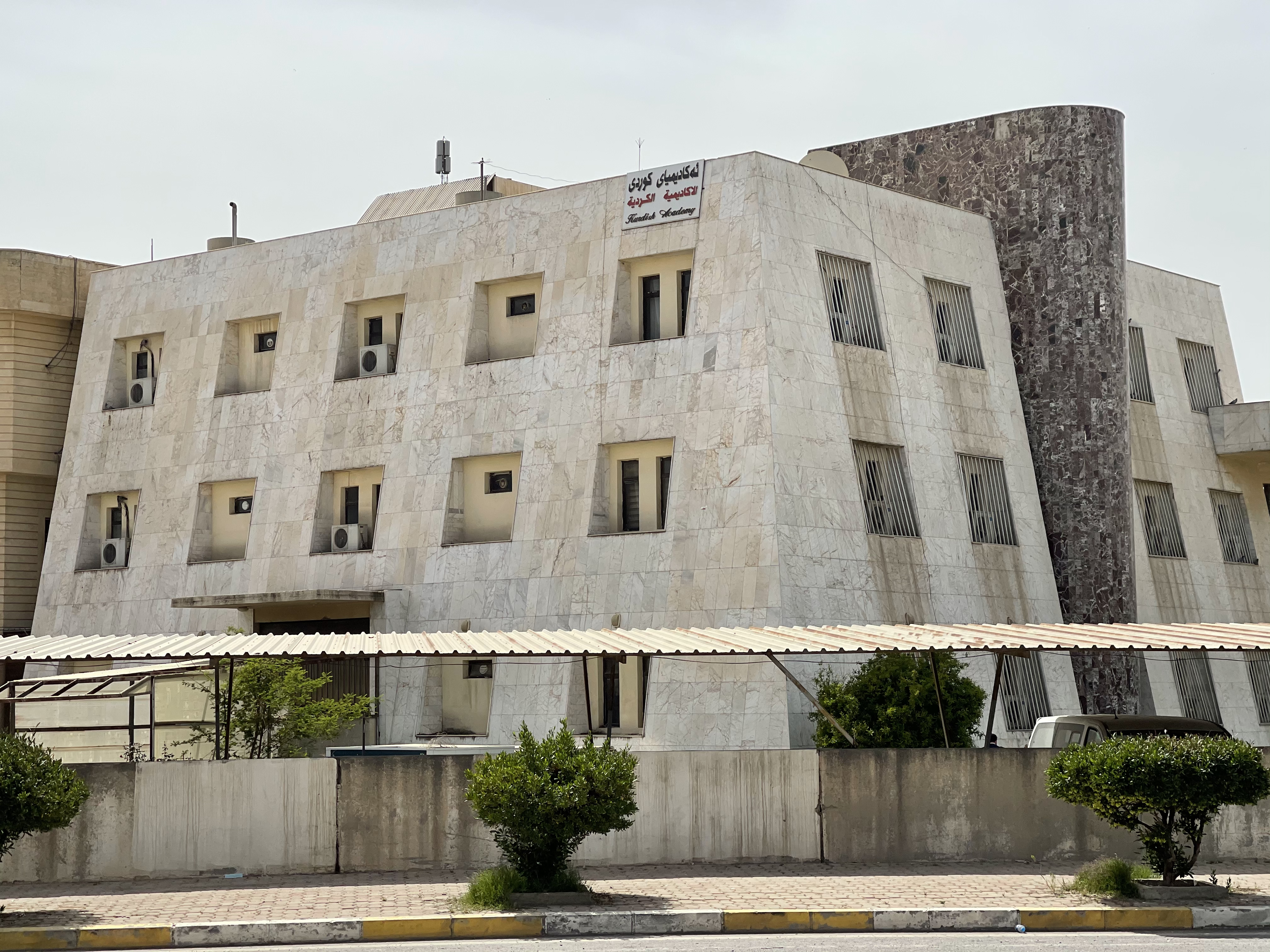
Side view

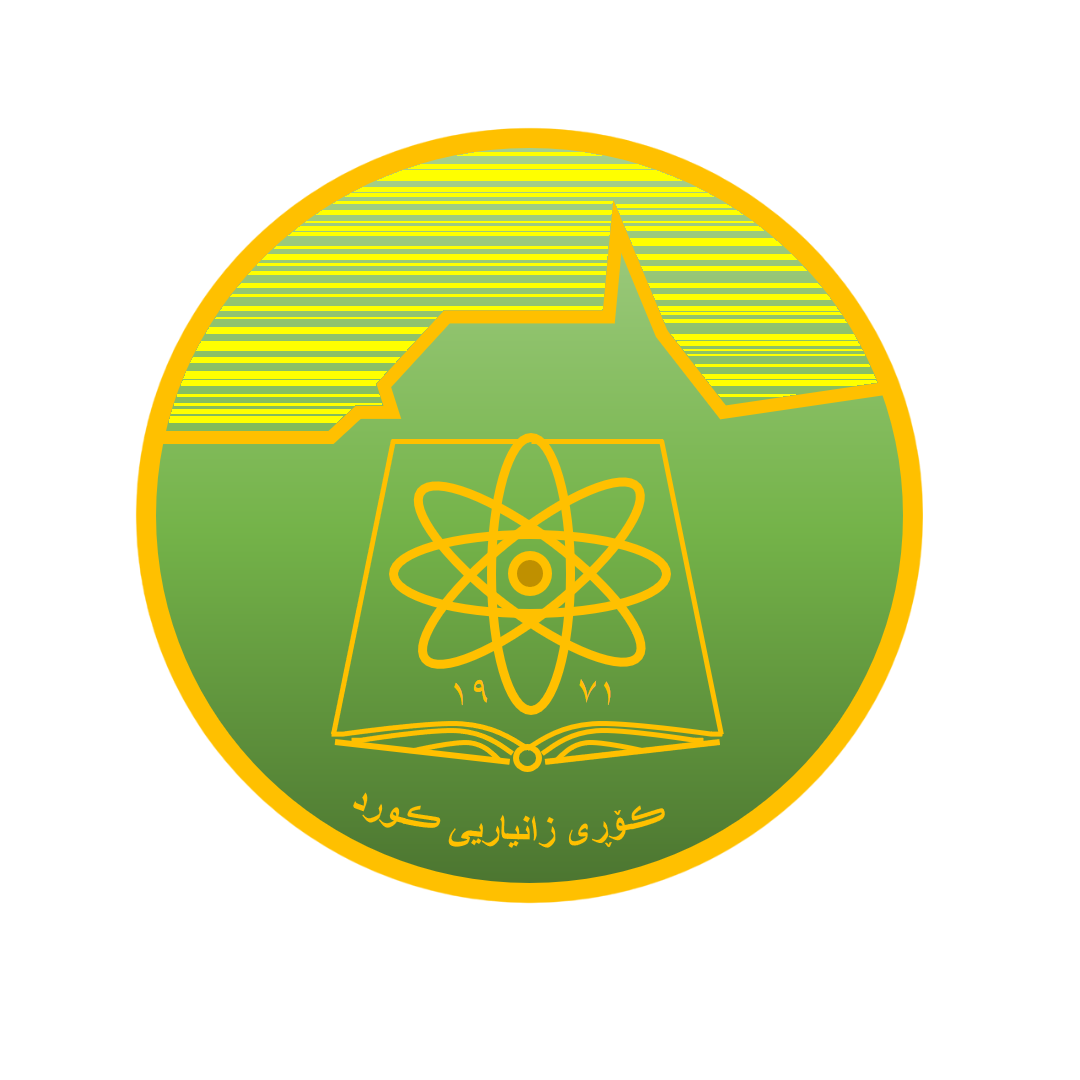
Former logo of the Academy
