= List of Arabic language academies =

This is a list of Arabic language academies. Some are officially named "Academy of the Arabic Language", "Arabic Language Academy", or something else.

== Overview ==
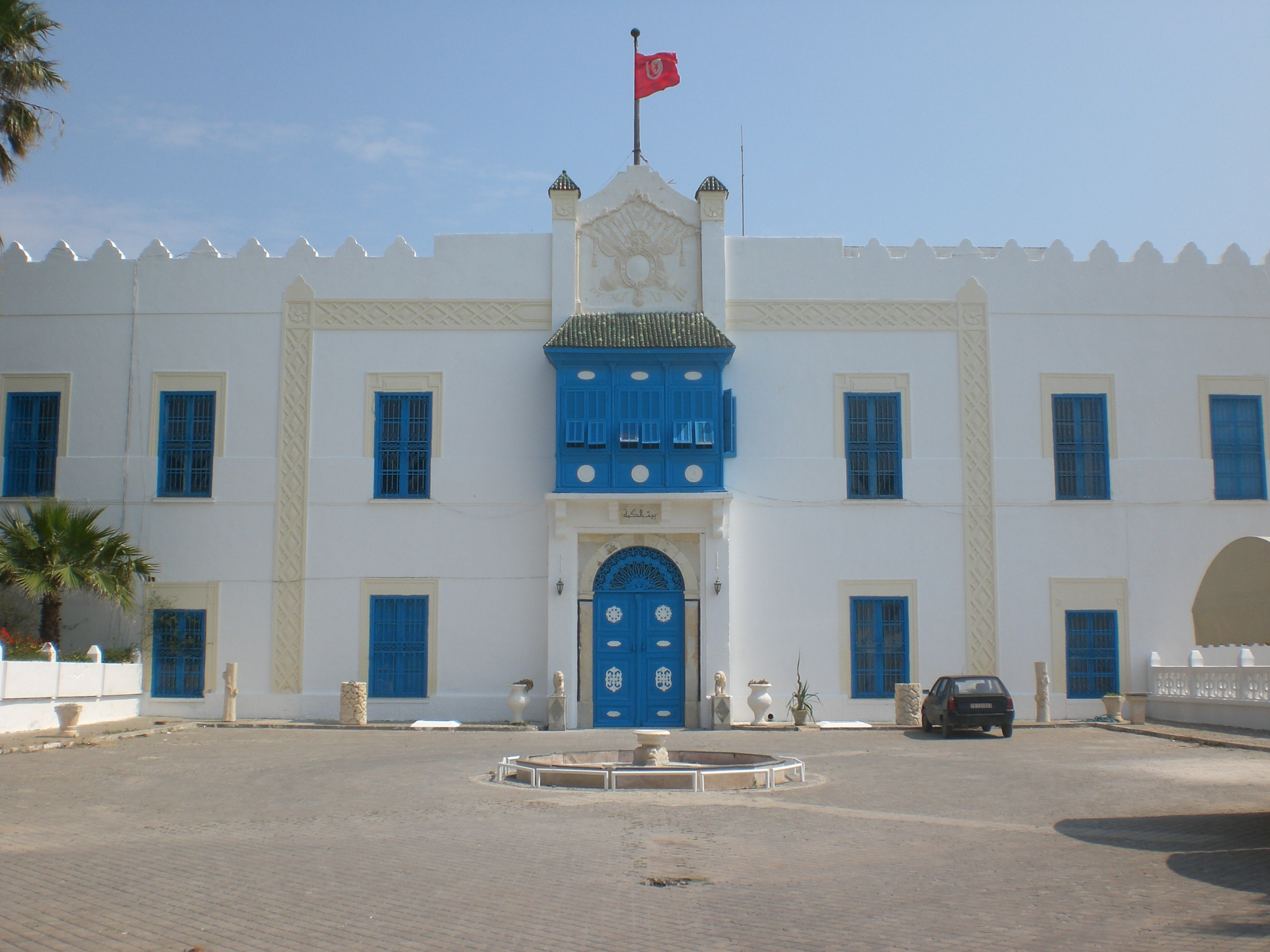
Main building of the Tunisian Academy of Sciences, Letters, and Arts (Beït Al-Hikma) in Tunis, Tunisia (2009)

Arabic Linguistic Academies are scientific research institutions concerned with terminology, Arabization, and the language in all fields of human knowledge. Some researchers trace the origins of linguistic academies back to the scientific institutions of the ancient East, and some even attempt to trace their roots to the beginning of human history. Others have referred to the councils of Socrates and Plato, known as the Academy, named after the Greek mythical hero who was considered the protector of Athens. These ancient councils and scientific institutions reflect the concern that peoples have had throughout history for transferring knowledge, sciences, and civilizations into their languages in order to achieve renaissance, progress, and encourage creativity and authorship.

Perhaps the most accurate way to view linguistic academies is through the linguistic and intellectual stages that people go through during their renaissance, and the interaction between their language and the languages of other nations, especially with the intellectual progress in sciences, literature, and arts. This is what happened for the Arabs after they left their homeland to spread the Islamic call. New circumstances arose for the Arabic language, and it had to face multiple challenges from an early period, whether related to Arabizing state institutions, transferring sciences and knowledge, or even teaching the Arabic language itself. The earliest attempts to establish institutions that faced these new requirements can be considered the first nucleus of our linguistic academies. The oldest of these institutions in our history is the Translation Committee established by the Umayyad Prince Khalid ibn Yazid ibn Muawiya ibn Abi Sufyan (d. 85 AH) in Damascus to translate chemical books and others from Greek to Arabic. This idea became popular in later Islamic periods, with caliphs giving translation and transfer great attention, such as Caliph Al-Mansur and Harun al-Rashid, who laid the foundations of Bayt al-Hikma, an institution that reached its peak during the reign of Al-Ma'mun.

== List of Arabic academies ==
Name	City	Country	Founded
Arab Academy of Damascus	Damascus	Syria	1919
Jordan Academy of Arabic	Amman	Jordan	1924 (1976)
Academy of the Arabic Language in Cairo	Cairo	Egypt	1932
Iraqi Academy of Sciences	Baghdad	Iraq	1948
Institute for Studies and Research on Arabization	Rabat	Morocco	1962
Tunisian Academy of Sciences, Letters, and Arts (Beït Al-Hikma)	Tunis	Tunisia	1983 (1992)
Academy of the Arabic Language in Khartum	Khartum	Sudan	1993
Palestinian Academy of the Arabic Language	Ramallah	State of Palestine	1994
Supreme Council of the Arabic language in Algeria	Algiers	Algeria	1996
Mogadishu Institute of Languages	Mogadishu	Somalia	1997
Academy of the Arabic Language in Libya	Tripoli	Libya	1999
Academy of the Arabic Language in Israel	Haifa	Israel	2007
Lebanese Academy of Sciences	Koura District	Lebanon	2007
Arabic Language Academy in Sharjah	Sharjah	United Arab Emirates	2016
King Salman Global Academy for Arabic Language	Riyadh	Saudi Arabia	2020

== See also ==
- House of Wisdom (Bayt al-Ḥikmah) or Great Library of Baghdad (8th century – 1258)
