= Jerash University =

University in Jerash, Jordan

- جامعة جرش
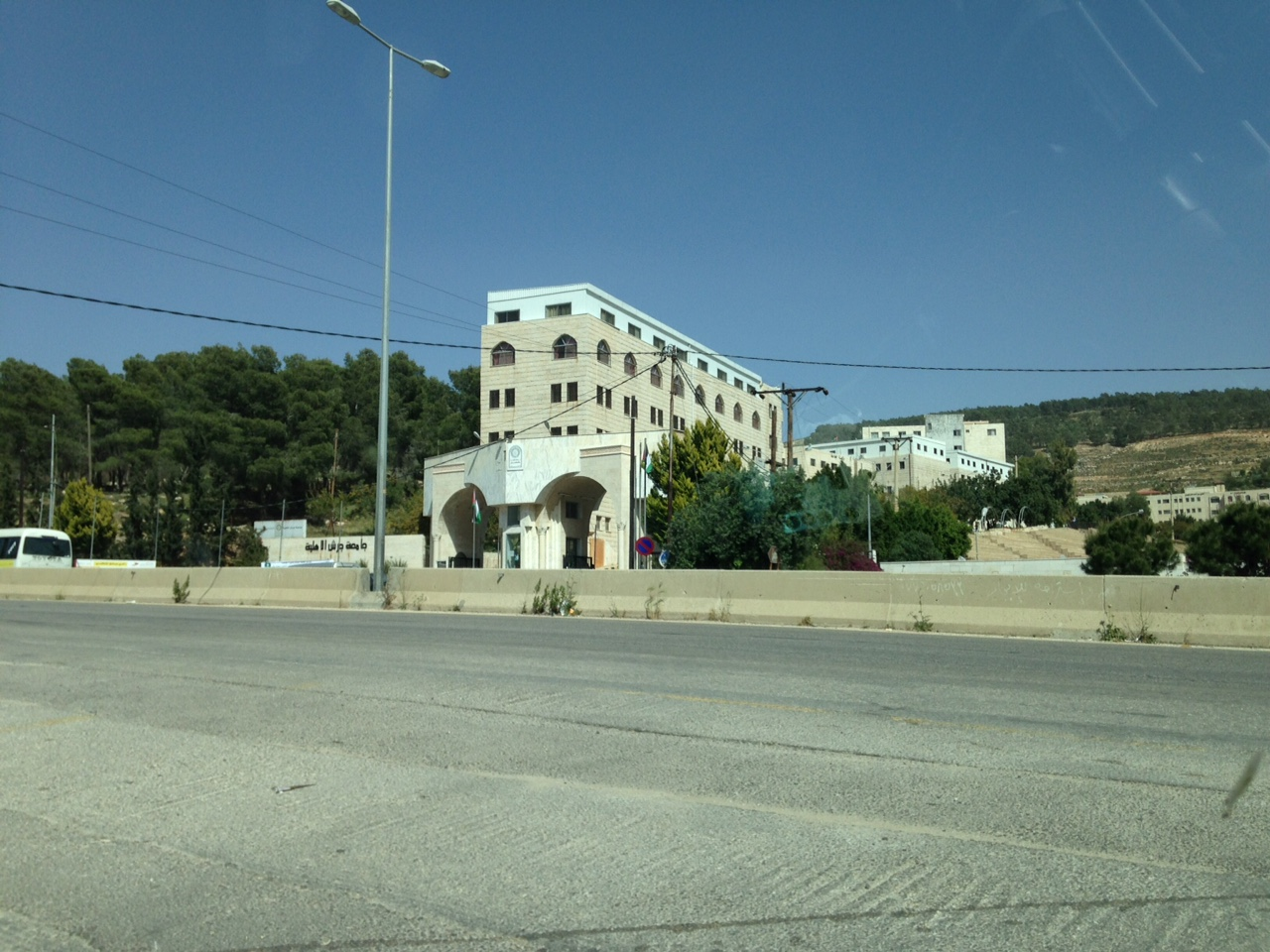
- Type: Private
- Established: 1992; 34 years ago
- Affiliations: IAU, FUIW, AArU
- Chairman: Imad Rabie
- President: Youssef Abu Al-Adous
- Location: Jerash, Jordan
- Campus: Urban 200 acres (0.81 km^{2})
- Colors: Green and Brown ^{[a]}
- Website: www.jpu.edu.jo

Jerash University or Jerash Private University (Arabic: جامعة جرش الخاصة) is the only university in Jerash Governorate, Jordan, located about 5 kilometers (3.1 mi) from Jerash city center. The university offers undergraduate degrees in Arts and science.

The approval of the Ministry of Higher Education to establish this university was granted in 1992, and teaching process started in the university in 1993. It was the first private university in northern Jordan. Jerash University is located on an area of more than three hundred dunams. The area of the university's buildings is approximately 70.000 square meters. It includes twelve faculties: Faculty of Arts, Faculty of Educational Sciences, Faculty of Business, Faculty of Law, Faculty of Sharia, Faculty of Science, Faculty of Engineering, Faculty of Pharmacy, Faculty of Nursing, Faculty of Information Technology, Faculty of Agriculture and Faculty of Applied Medical Sciences.

== Academics ==
There were ten colleges in the university in 2012:

- Faculty of Information Technology :
  1. Computer Science
  2. Computer Networks .
- Faculty of Literature:
  1. Arabic Literatures,
  2. English Literatures,
  3. Translation,
  4. Social Science
  5. Humanities.
- Faculty of Nursing :
  1. Nursing .
- Faculty of Engineering :
  1. Civil Of Engineering
  2. Electronics & Telecom
  3. Architecture .
- Faculty of Science :
  1. chemistry
  2. Biology
  3. Mathematics
  4. Physics .
- Faculty of Economics and Administrative Science :
  1. Accounting
  2. Admin sciences
  3. Finance and Banking science
- Faculty of Educational Sciences :
  1. Classroom Teaching
  2. kindergarten
  3. General Administration
  4. General Curriculum.
- Faculty of Shari'a (Islamic Studies):
  1. Jurisprudence
  2. Comparative Jurisprudence .
- Faculty of Agriculture: the only private university in Jordan that offers a degree in agricultural sciences.
  1. Plants Production
  2. Animals Production
  3. agricultural Economics
  4. Food & Nutrition .
- Faculty of Law :
  1. Public Law
  2. Private Law .
- Faculty of Pharmacy :
  1. Pharmacy .
- Applied Medical Science:
1. physical Therapy

== Library ==
The university contains also four deanships: Deanship of Scientific Research and Graduate Studies, Deanship of Accreditation and Quality, Deanship of Student Affairs, and Deanship of distance education.

As for the bachelor's majors, the university offers 26 majors for bachelor's degree, and 10 majors master's degree.

In addition, the university has a computerized scientific library encompassing nearly 125.000 volumes and books.

The university's Strategic Plan 2019-2022 includes eleven themes, namely:

I- Study programs and plans.

II- Scientific research.

III- Human Resources.

IV- Students.

V- Quality Management.

VI- Infrastructure.

VII- Administrative Development.

VIII- Community Service.

IX-Promoting the university's financial position.

X- Global Spread.

XI- Governance and Strategic Planning.

== Centers ==
- Languages Center
- Consultations
- Computer and IT Center.
- Career Guidance .
- Consultant Office.

== See also ==
- List of Islamic educational institutions
