= Rafif al-Yasiri =

- رفيف الياسري
- Born: 19 December 1985; Baghdad, Iraq
- Died: 16 August 2018 (aged 32); Baghdad, Iraq
- Other names: Rafef al-Yasiri, Barbie of Iraq
- Occupations: Plastic surgeon, TV host, Writer, Media personality
- Years active: 2007–2018
- Known for: Plastic surgery, TV hosting, humanitarian work
- Spouse: Fadhil Al-Yasiri
- Children: 1

Rafif al-Yasiri (Arabic: رفيف الياسري), better known as Barbie of Iraq (19 December 1985 – 16 August 2018), was an Iraqi plastic surgeon and conductor of national programs specializing in medical affairs for women. In March 2018, she was appointed Goodwill Ambassador of the French Organization for Human Rights and Peace. She had the center for plastic surgery and laser operations in the Al-Jadriya area in Baghdad.

== Death ==
Al-Yasiri died on 16 August 2018 at Sheikh Zayed Hospital, One of the doctors at the hospital stated that Rafif was dead when she had arrived at Sheikh Zayed Hospital. According to the Interior Minister, she died of a drug overdose. However, the circumstances are still mysterious.

== See also ==
- Rasha al-Hassan, Suʽad al-ʽAli, and Tara Fares, prominent Iraqi women who died shortly after al-Yasiri and were speculatively linked together as the "Thursday victims", despite little connection between the women in life
