= Yoruba Academy =

- Formation: October 2007
- Purpose: Promotion of the Yoruba language
- Headquarters: Ibadan, Oyo State, Nigeria
- Director General: Prof. Dhikrullah Yagboyaju

The Yoruba Academy is an independent, non-profit, non-partisan, non-governmental, multi-disciplinary institution set up to shepherd the growth and development of Yorùbá language, arts, and culture, through collaboration with scholars, politicians, businessmen and experts in Yoruba language, culture, economics, law, science and technology, and governance.

It was founded in Ibadan, Oyo State, Nigeria in October 2007 following a retreat of young Yoruba professionals. It is supported by private funding from individuals and other nonprofits, including the Afẹ́nifẹ́re Renewal Group. Its main mission is to ensure the preservation and revitalization of the Yorùbá language as well as the socio-cultural and economic development of the Yorùbá peoples worldwide – that is, both in its South-West homeland in Nigeria and in the Diaspora.

It is also committed to encouraging and funding research and systematic reflections on the history, culture, position, and future of the Yorùbá in the context of Nigeria and in a globalising world, towards helping to create and sustain freedom of thought, and providing a platform for effective linkage between research and human development.

== History ==
The academy came into being through two disparate organisations working towards the same goal at different times. The first was led by the former minister for education Professor Babátúndé Fáfúnwá and Professor Wálé Ọmọ́le, and the second was formed when, in 2007, a group of Yoruba elders gathered at the International Institute of Tropical Agriculture in Ibadan to discuss the future of the language. It was suggested that the two efforts be merged and called The Yoruba Academy. Professor Fáfúnwa was elected as its first Chairman of Board of Trustees.

The mission of the academy is to look after Yorùbá language worldwide, advocate for policies that will ensure it survival and revitalization, organize activities and events to further these goals, and support the creation of a dictionary to set a standard for the Yoruba language. The academy, in this way, is modelled after Académie Française, the preeminent council for the French language, the Goethe-Institut and the Confucius Institute.

Yorùbá language is currently spoken in Nigeria, mostly in the South-West of the country in Ekiti State, Lagos State, Ogun State, Oyo State, Osun State, Ondo State, Kwara State, and parts of Kogi State, It is also spoken in other African countries such as Togo, Benin, Sierra Leone and parts of Ghana; it is spoken outside of Africa in Haiti, Cuba, Puerto Rico, Brazil, United States, and the United Kingdom.

== The Mandate of the Academy ==
According to its founding documents, the Yorùbá Academy will:

- Conserve, enrich and promote the heritage of the Yorùbá, its culture, tradition, ethics and values
- Deepen the knowledge and understanding of Yorùbá language and culture and work towards its preservation
- Document Yorùbá contribution to world civilisation
- Encourage and promote continuous acquisition and management of knowledge to guide Yorùbá growth and development
- Promote scholarship that focuses on addressing development challenges of the Yorùbá and innovating for the public good
- Formulate strategic development policies for the Yorùbá
- Promote cultural, social and economic institutions
- Organise cultural and technical exchanges between Yorùbá in the homeland and Yorùbá in the Diaspora:
- Carry out other activities that promote the broad vision and mission of the Yorùbá Academy

This framework accommodates every Yorùba in the Homeland and the Diaspora, as well as friends and scholars of Yorùbá.

== Programming ==
Children's Day Celebration hosted by the Yoruba Academy

The academy has organized events, talks, and commemoration activities since its founding. In 2016, it brought all the Yorùbá kings and governors to Ibadan to mark the "120th Jubilee of World’s Longest Civil War"

== Leadership ==
The academy is supported by a Management Committee, a Board of Trustees, and a cohort of Academy Fellows and Patrons chosen from a pool of professionals around the world. It is led by a Director General who is appointed for a multi-year tenure.

Since its inception, it has had 5 directors:

- Professor Wálé Adébánwí (2008-2011)
- Dr Ìyábọ̀ Basir (2011-2012)
- Dr. Adé Adéagbo (2012-2020)
- Kọ́lá Túbọ̀sún (2020-2021)
- Dr. Dhikrullah Yagboyaju (2025-)
