= Scots Language Centre =

Organisation promoting the use of Scots

The Scots Language Centre (Scots: Centre for the Scots Leid) is an organisation that promotes the use of the Scots language. The director of the Scots Language Centre is Dr Jamie Fairbairn. It receives funding from the Scottish Government.

== History ==
The organisation was founded in 1993 as the Scots Language Resource Centre. In 1996, the centre held a "Spellin Collogue" in an attempt to reform Scots orthography, but was ultimately unsuccessful.

In preparation for a new question on the census asking whether residents could understand Scots, the organisation launched a website with example of the language to allow respondents to determine if they could.

A digital map of Scotland with Scots place names was published by the Centre in 2019. During 2020, the Centre researched Scots exonyms for European settlements and countries and compiled a map based on this information the following year. In November 2021, the Centre produced a Scots dialectal map of Scotland. In September 2021, the Centre published a guide for writing in Scots.
