= Tara Fares =

Iraqi model and fashionista (1996–2018)

- Born: 10 January 1996; Baghdad, Ba'athist Iraq
- Died: 27 September 2018 (aged 22); Baghdad, Iraq
- Occupations: Model, social activist, Internet celebrity
- Spouse: Divorced
- Children: 1
- Beauty pageant titleholder
- Title: Miss Baghdad
- Years active: 2014–2018
- Hair color: Black
- Eye color: Brown

Tara Fares (Arabic: تارة فارس; 10 January 1996 – 27 September 2018) was an Iraqi model, beauty blogger and Instagram star.

== Biography ==
Fares was born in Baghdad, her father is an Iraqi Christian and her mother a Lebanese Shiite.

Fares was forced to get married at the age of 16. She later said that her husband had been abusive. She recounted years after getting pregnant at age 17 of her forced marriage. Her pregnancy was concealed by her parents who then found another family for her.

In 2013, Fares was voted beauty queen of Baghdad and went on to compete in the Miss Iraq competition, where she was a runner-up.

Fares had a large following on social media site Instagram, with 2.7 million followers at the time of her death.

In July 2018, Fares said in a post on Instagram, "It does not frighten me that there are those who reject the existence of God. What really frightens me is there are those who kill and slaughter to prove the existence of God." After her death this post was widely shared by her followers.

== Death ==
On 27 September 2018, she was shot three times by an unknown gunman in Baghdad while driving her Porsche Boxster convertible. She was taken to hospital, where she died. Iraq's Interior Minister Qasim al-Araji stated that those responsible for her murder were members of "an extremist Shiite group" who had received dishonourable discharges from different armed factions. However, the names of any suspects had still not been released as of October 2020.

Numerous conspiracy theories have circulated about her death. Many people reject the government’s reason and blame the murder on the young woman's freedom, which bothered many extremist militias. The exhibition of her tattoos and her naked photos on her social networks have always been taken for provocation by religious population.

Her death was followed by numerous death threats against other Iraqi social media stars, with the same lifestyle as Tara.

== See also ==
- Rafif al-Yasiri, Rasha al-Hassan and Suʽad al-ʽAli, prominent Iraqi women who died around the same time as Fares and were speculatively linked together as the "Thursday victims"
