= Ahmad Matlub =

Ahmad Matloob
- أحمد مطلوب
- Born: 25 October 1936; Al-Awja
- Died: 21 July 2018 (aged 81)
- Occupations: Writer and academic

Ahmad Matloob (Arabic: أحمد مطلوب, romanized: Aḥmad Maṭlūb; 25 October 1936 – 21 July 2018) was an Iraqi writer and academic, he was a professor of Rhetoric and Criticism, President of the Iraqi Scientific Academy, and Minister of Culture and Guidance in the Republic of Iraq in 1967.

== Early life and education ==
Ahmed was born on Sunday, Sha'ban 10, 1355 AH / October 25, 1936 AD, in Tikrit, Iraq. He studied elementary and middle school in Tikrit (1941-1950), then he studied high school in Karbala and completed it in Karkh, Baghdad. He obtained a bachelor's degree in Arabic from the College of Arts and Sciences in Baghdad (Department of Arabic Language) with distinction and graduated first of his class of 1956.. Then he obtained a master's degree in rhetoric and criticism with an excellent degree from Cairo University in 1961, then a doctorate in rhetoric and criticism with first honors from Cairo University in 1963.

== Career ==
Ahmed worked as a teacher in Kirkuk and Baghdad between 1957 and 1958. He later worked at the College of Arts at the University of Baghdad since 1958 as a teaching assistant, teacher, assistant professor, associate professor, and then professor. In 1964, Ahmed became Director General of Press and Guidance in the Ministry of Culture and Guidance. He worked as Director-General of Culture in the same ministry in 1964. Between 1966-to 1969. Ahmed worked as Head of the Media Department at the University of Baghdad.

In 1967, Dr. Ahmed Matloob became the Minister of Culture and Guidance in the Republic of Iraq. Then he joined Kuwait University as a delegate professor between 1971 and 1978. He worked as a visiting professor at the Institute of Arab Research and Studies in Cairo, Martin Luther University in German democracy, and Oran University in Algeria.

Ahmed became Dean of the College of Arts at the University of Baghdad from 1984 to 1986, and Secretary-General of the Higher Commission for the Care of the Arabic Language in Iraq from 1986 to 2003. In 2007, he held the position of President of the Iraqi Scientific Academy, which is considered the highest scientific body in Iraq, and a member of the Jordanian Arabic Language Academy and the Jordanian Academy.

== Awards ==
He was awarded the King Faisal International Prize in the Arabic Language and Literature Branch at a ceremony held in Riyadh. This award was shared equally with Professor Muhammad Rashad Muhammad Al-Saleh Hamzawy (the Tunisian), Professor of Arabic Language and Head of the Arabic Language Department at the College of Arts at Sultan Qaboos University, for the year 1428 AH.

== Works ==
Has published 37 books on rhetoric, criticism, literature, dictionaries, and Arabization. Moreover, 15 verified books of heritage books on poetry and the eloquence of the Noble Qur'an. More than 60 scientific papers have been published in linguistics, criticism, language, the sciences of the Qur'an, interpretation, hadith, and the Arabization of science and scientific terminology. Such as:

- Sculpture in the Arabic language: study and glossary.
- A Dictionary of Arab Criticism Terms.
- Dictionary of clothes in Lisan Al Arab.
- A dictionary of rhetorical terms and their development.
- Diwan Al-Jin Al-Homsi. In partnership with Abdullah Al-Jiuri.
- A masterpiece of what is strange in the Qur'an.
- A Dictionary of Ratio by Alif and Nun.
- Abdul Qaher Al-Jerjani.
- 1980: Al-Qazwini and summary explanations.
- 1980: Arabic Rhetoric: Meanings, Statem/nt, and Badi.
- 1981: The rhetoric of Al-Jahiz.
- 1981: Rhetorical methods: eloquence - rhetoric - meanings.
- 1982: Rhetoric and application.
- 1982: Rhetorical research among Arabs.
- 1983: Arabic numerals.
- 2015: Rafiqa Omari, Central Diyala University Press.
- 2020: In Rehab Al-Qalam (a book in several parts).

== Death ==
Ahmad Matloob died in Baghdad on July 21, 2018.
