= Ulaga Tamil Sangam =

Tamil language research centre

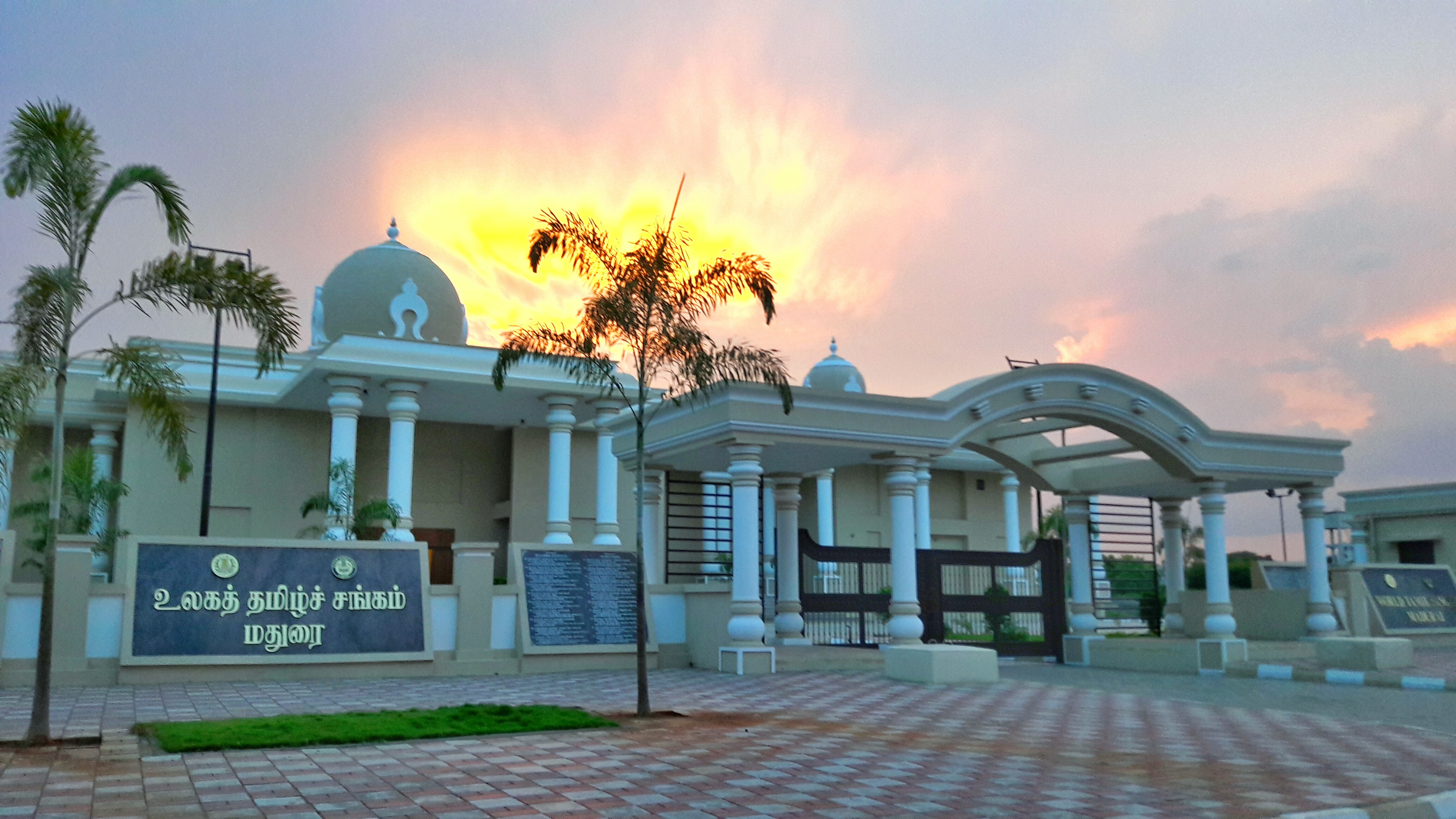

Ulaga Tamil Sangam, also known as the World Tamil Sangam, established on 1 March 2016, is a centre for higher research for Tamil language located in the city of Madurai in Tamil Nadu, India. the Ulaga Tamil Sangam building has comes into existence over an area of 87,300 square feet after 35 years of its conception by the then Chief Minister M.G. Ramachandran and it was declared open by Chief Minister Jayalalithaa through video conference from Chennai on 1 March 2016.
