= 2018 Asdira funeral bombing =

Terrorist incident in Iraq

- Location: Asdira, Al-Shirqat District, Saladin Governorate, Iraq
- Date: 12 April 2018
- Deaths: 25
- Injuries: 18

The 2018 Asdira funeral bombing took place on 12 April 2018, in the village of Asdira, located in the Al-Shirqat District of Saladin Governorate in Iraq. The bombing killed 25 people and wounded 18 others. The attack took place at a funeral for Iraqi fighters who had been killed by ISIS.

== See also ==
- 2016 Sana'a funeral airstrike
