= Jordan Academy of Arabic =

Arabic language regulator of Jordan

- مجمع اللغة العربية الأردني
- Jordan Academy of Arabic logo

Agency overview
- Formed: 1924
- Jurisdiction: Ministry of Higher Education and Scientific Research
- Headquarters: Amman, Jordan
- Agency executive: Abdul Karim Khalif, Director
- Parent agency: University of Jordan
- Website: https://arabic.jo/

The Jordan Academy of Arabic (Arabic: مجمع اللغة العربية الأردني) is one of the Arabic language regulators based in Amman, Jordan. Besides the Jordan Academy of Arabic, there are 10 other Arabic language and literature regulators in the world. It has been set up to start by 1924, but could only start by 1974.

It has a biannual journal named: "The Journal of Jordan Academy of Arabic"(Arabic مجلة مجمع اللغة العربية الأردني) (ISSN 0258-1094). Many dictionaries and occasional publications have been also produced by this Academy, as its interest covers Arabization of technical and professional terms, facilitating the use of Arabic in tertiary education as well as regulating the Arabic language and literature.

== History ==
The founding of the Jordan Academy of Arabic was published in the Journal of the Arab Scientific Academy in Damascus in January, 1924. It was the second Arabic language regulator to be founded in the Arab world after the Arab Scientific Academy in Damascus which was founded in 1919. Due to the scarcity of financial, scientific and human resources, it was short-lived. A royal decree to re-establish the Jordan Academy of Arabic was issued in 1976. It officially assumed its responsibilities as of the first of October 1976, and joined the Cairo-based Union of Arab Scientific and Language Academies in 1977.

== Objectives of the Academy ==
The Academy aims to achieve a number of objectives, including: preserving the integrity of the Arabic language, ensuring it keeps pace with the demands of modern literature, science, and the arts, promoting the Arabic language to meet the demands of a knowledge-based society, developing dictionaries of terminology for science, literature, and the arts, and striving to standardize terminology in cooperation with educational, scientific, linguistic, and cultural institutions inside and outside the Kingdom. It also seeks to revive the Arab and Islamic heritage. The Academy also seeks to cooperate with various educational institutions inside and outside the Kingdom to standardize language terminology.

== See also ==
- Jordanian Arabic
- Arabic literature
- List of language regulators
