= Ministry of Education (Jordan) =

Government ministry of Jordan

- وزارة التربية والتعليم وزارة التربية والتعليم
- Emblem of Jordan

Agency overview
- Formed: 1921 Wizarat al-Ma'arif (وزارة المعارف); 1956 Wizarat ạl-Tarbiah w al-Ta'lim (وزارة التربية والتعليم)
- Jurisdiction: Government of Jordan
- Headquarters: Al Abdali, Amman, Jordan
- Minister responsible: Azmi Mahafzah
- Agency executive: Minister of Education

The Ministry of Education (Arabic: وزارة التربية والتعليم) in Jordan is a government body responsible for developing and administering educational policies and programs throughout the Kingdom. The ministry's mandate is to "ensure the provision of quality education from the early years through secondary education."

The Ministry of Education is currently led by Minister Azmi Mahafzah.

== History and structure ==
The Ministry of Education was established in its current form in 1956, although its roots date back to earlier efforts to formalize education in Jordan during the Emirate of Transjordan in 1921. The ministry operates under the leadership of the Minister of Education, who oversees various departments responsible for different aspects of the educational system, including curriculum development, teacher training, and school administration.

=== Ministers of Education ===
This table includes all the Jordanian Ministers of Education along with their respective dates of taking office and leaving office:

List of Jordanian Ministers of Education
No.	Minister	Took office	Left office	Time in office
1	Mazhar Raslan	April 11, 1921	June 23, 1921	73 days
2	Adib Hussein Wahbeh	August 8, 1921	July 3, 1923	1 year, 329 days
3	Ali Bey Khalki	September 5, 1923	May 3, 1924	241 days
4	Adib Hussein Wahbeh	September 12, 1924	September 25, 1935	11 years, 13 days
5	Ahmad Alawi Al-Saqqaf	December 6, 1939	September 24, 1940	293 days
6	Ahmad Alawi Al-Saqqaf	September 24, 1940	July 29, 1941	308 days
7	Samir Al-Rifai	July 29, 1941	December 6, 1942	1 year, 130 days
8	Ahmad Alawi Al-Saqqaf	December 6, 1942	May 9, 1943	154 days
9	Samir Al-Rifai	May 9, 1943	October 30, 1943	174 days
10	Mohammad Al-Ansi	October 30, 1943	July 13, 1944	257 days
11	Ahmad Alawi Al-Saqqaf	July 13, 1944	October 14, 1944	93 days
12	Sheikh Fahmi Hashim	October 14, 1944	May 18, 1945	216 days
13	Sheikh Fahmi Hashim	May 18, 1945	September 8, 1946	1 year, 113 days
14	Mohammad Al-Shariki	September 8, 1946	February 4, 1947	149 days
15	Sheikh Mohammad Amin Al-Shinqiti	February 4, 1947	December 27, 1947	326 days
16	Sheikh Mohammad Amin Al-Shinqiti	December 27, 1947	May 3, 1949	1 year, 127 days
17	Sheikh Mohammad Amin Al-Shinqiti	May 7, 1949	April 12, 1950	340 days
18	Sheikh Mohammad Amin Al-Shinqiti	April 12, 1950	October 14, 1950	185 days
19	Ahmad Toukan	October 14, 1950	December 4, 1950	51 days
20	Ahmad Touqan	December 4, 1950	July 25, 1951	233 days
21	Rouhi Abdul Hadi	July 25, 1951	September 7, 1951	44 days
22	Rouhi Abdul Hadi	September 7, 1951	September 30, 1952	1 year, 23 days
23	Abdul Halim Al-Nimr	September 30, 1952	May 5, 1953	217 days
24	Ahmad Toukan	May 5, 1953	May 2, 1954	362 days
25	Anwar Nuseibeh	May 2, 1954	October 21, 1954	172 days
26	Anwar Nuseibeh	October 24, 1954	May 28, 1955	216 days
27	Saeed Aladdin	May 30, 1955	December 14, 1955	198 days
28	Omar Al-Saleh Al-Barghouti	December 14, 1955	December 21, 1955	7 days
29	Fawzi Mulki	December 21, 1955	January 8, 1956	18 days
30	Dhaifallah Al-Hamoud	January 9, 1956	April 1, 1956	83 days
31	Dhaifallah Al-Hamoud	April 1, 1956	May 20, 1956	49 days
32	Fawzi Mulki	May 22, 1956	July 1, 1956	40 days
33	Saeed Aladdin	July 1, 1956	October 29, 1956	120 days
34	Shafiq Arshidat	October 29, 1956	April 10, 1957	163 days
35	Fawzi Mulki	April 15, 1957	April 24, 1957	9 days
36	Khulusi Al-Khairi	April 25, 1957	July 12, 1957	78 days
37	Jamal Touqan	July 15, 1957	August 25, 1957	41 days
38	Ali Al-Hindawi (acting)	August 27, 1957	October 21, 1957	55 days
39	Ahmad Al-Tarawneh	October 22, 1957	May 18, 1958	208 days
40	Ahmad Al-Tarawneh	May 18, 1958	July 10, 1958	53 days
41	Sheikh Mohammad Ali Al-Ja'abari	July 10, 1958	January 28, 1959	202 days
42	Riyadh Al-Muflah	January 28, 1959	May 6, 1959	98 days
43	Sheikh Mohammad Amin Al-Shinqiti	May 6, 1959	August 29, 1960	1 year, 115 days
44	Sheikh Mohammad Amin Al-Shinqiti	August 29, 1960	June 28, 1961	303 days
45	Rafiq Al-Husseini	June 28, 1961	November 5, 1961	130 days
46	Bashir Al-Sabbagh	November 5, 1961	January 27, 1962	83 days
47	Sheikh Ibrahim Al-Qattan	January 27, 1962	December 2, 1962	309 days
48	Abdulwahab Al-Majali	December 2, 1962	March 27, 1963	115 days
49	Hassan Al-Kayed	March 27, 1963	April 21, 1963	25 days
50	Hassan Al-Kayed	April 21, 1963	July 9, 1963	79 days
51	Hassan Al-Kayed	July 9, 1963	October 31, 1963	114 days
52	Bashir Al-Sabbagh	October 31, 1963	July 6, 1964	249 days
53	Bashir Al-Sabbagh	July 6, 1964	February 13, 1965	222 days
54	Abdel Latif Abdeen	February 13, 1965	July 31, 1965	168 days
55	Thouqan Hindawi	July 31, 1965	December 25, 1966	1 year, 147 days
56	Abdulwahab Al-Majali	December 22, 1966	March 4, 1967	72 days
57	Thouqan Hindawi	March 4, 1967	April 23, 1967	50 days
58	Thouqan Hindawi	April 23, 1967	August 2, 1967	101 days
59	Thouqan Hindawi	August 2, 1967	October 7, 1967	66 days
60	Mohammad Adeeb Al-Ameri	October 7, 1967	April 25, 1968	201 days
61	Bashir Al-Sabbagh	April 25, 1968	March 14, 1968	−42 days
62	Thouqan Hindawi	March 24, 1969	July 13, 1969	111 days
63	Thouqan Hindawi	August 13, 1969	April 20, 1970	250 days
64	Thouqan Hindawi	April 20, 1970	June 28, 1970	69 days
65	Thouqan Hindawi	June 28, 1970	September 15, 1970	79 days
66	Ibrahim Sayel	September 16, 1970	September 26, 1970	10 days
67	Abdulmajid Al-Sharideh	September 26, 1970	October 28, 1970	32 days
68	Ishaq Al-Farhan	October 28, 1970	May 26, 1973	2 years, 210 days
69	Mudar Badran	May 27, 1973	November 23, 1974	1 year, 180 days
70	Thouqan Hindawi	November 24, 1974	July 12, 1976	1 year, 231 days
71	Thouqan Hindawi	July 12, 1976	November 27, 1976	138 days
72	Abdullah Al-Majali	November 27, 1976	December 18, 1979	3 years, 21 days
73	Mohammad Nouri Shafiq	December 19, 1979	August 27, 1980	252 days
74	Sa'id Al-Tall	August 28, 1980	January 10, 1981	135 days
75	Hikmat Al-Saket	January 10, 1984	April 4, 1985	1 year, 84 days
76	Abdulwahab Al-Majali	April 4, 1985	October 4, 1986	1 year, 183 days
77	Thouqan Hindawi	October 4, 1986	April 24, 1989	2 years, 202 days
78	Abdullah Ensour	April 27, 1989	August 30, 1989	125 days
79	Adnan Badran	September 2, 1989	December 6, 1989	95 days
80	Mohammad Hamdan	December 7, 1989	June 18, 1990	193 days
81	Abdullah Al-Akayleh	June 18, 1990	June 19, 1991	1 year, 1 day
82	Eid Dahiyat	June 19, 1991	November 21, 1991	155 days
83	Thouqan Hindawi	November 21, 1991	May 29, 1993	1 year, 189 days
84	Khaled Al-Omari	May 29, 1993	June 7, 1994	1 year, 9 days
85	Abdelraouf Rawabdeh	June 8, 1994	March 14, 1995	279 days
86	Jawad Anani	March 14, 1995	September 19, 1995	189 days
87	Marwan Muasher	September 20, 1995	January 3, 1996	105 days
88	Ahmad Obeidat	January 3, 1996	February 18, 1998	2 years, 46 days
89	Mohammad Hamdan	February 18, 1998	1999	317 days
90	Fawzi Gharaibeh	1999	1999	364 days
91	Izzat Jaradat	April 1999	18 June 2000	1 year, 78 days
92	Khaled Toukan	June 2000	November 2007	7 years, 182 days
93	Tayseer Al-Noaimi	November 2007	June 2009	1 year, 241 days
94	Walid Maani	2009	14 December 2009	347 days
95	Ibrahim Badran	December 14, 2009	July 28, 2010	226 days
96	Khaled Al-Karaki	November 24, 2010	February 1, 2011	69 days
97	Tayseer Al-Noaimi	January 1, 2011	October 31, 2011	303 days
98	Eid Al-Dahiyat	October 1, 2011	April 30, 2012	212 days
99	Fayez Al-Saudi	April 1, 2012	October 31, 2012	213 days
100	Wajih Owais	October 1, 2012	March 31, 2013	181 days
101	Mohammad Juma'a Al-Wahsh	March 1, 2013	August 31, 2013	183 days
102	Mohammad Thneibat	August 1, 2013	January 31, 2017	3 years, 183 days
103	Omar Razzaz	January 1, 2017	June 30, 2018	1 year, 180 days
104	Azmi Mahafzah	June 14, 2018	November 28, 2018	167 days
105	Bassam Talhouni	November 1, 2018	January 31, 2019	91 days
106	Walid Maani	January 1, 2019	October 31, 2019	303 days
107	Tayseer Al-Noaimi	October 1, 2019	March 31, 2021	1 year, 181 days
108	Mohammad Khair Ahmad Abu Qudais	March 1, 2021	October 31, 2021	244 days
109	Wajih Owais	October 1, 2021	October 31, 2022	1 year, 30 days
110	Azmi Mahafzah	October 31, 2022	Incumbent	2 years, 361 days

=== Tawjihi examination ===
The Tawjihi is a pivotal national exam taken by students at the end of their secondary education. It is a comprehensive test that determines eligibility for higher education institutions in Jordan.

=== Higher education and vocational training ===
Upon passing the Tawjihi, students can pursue higher education in public or private universities, or opt for vocational training. The Ministry of Education also ensures the equivalency of foreign educational qualifications to the Tawjihi, enabling students with international backgrounds to integrate into the Jordanian educational system.

== Educational system ==
The Jordanian educational system is structured into three main levels:

1. Pre-school Education: This includes kindergarten and other early childhood education programs.
2. Basic Education: This compulsory stage lasts for 10 years, beginning at age 6. It aims to provide students with fundamental skills in literacy, numeracy, and critical thinking.
3. Secondary Education: After completing basic education, students enter secondary education, which spans two years and culminates in the General Certificate of Secondary Education Examination (Tawjihi).

== See also ==
- Education in Jordan
