= Tawjihi =

School qualification in Jordan and Palestine

Tawjihi (Arabic: توجيهي, also known as the General Secondary Education Certificate Examination; Arabic: امتحان شهادة الدراسة الثانوية العامة), is the national secondary school examination in Jordan and Palestine. It is taken at the end of upper secondary education.

Traditionally, Tawjihi concluded two years of secondary education (Grade 12) following ten years of basic schooling. It was conducted in specific academic (e.g., scientific, literary) or vocational streams.

As of the 2024–2025 academic year, the Jordanian Ministry of Education restructured the system. Tawjihi is now a two-year program covering Grades 11 and 12, with students selecting either academic or vocational (BTEC) tracks in Grade 9.

- In Grade 11, students sit ministerial exams in common subjects: Arabic, English, Jordanian history, and Islamic studies. The Grade 11 average contributes approximately 30% toward the final Tawjihi score.
- The remaining 70% comes from Grade 12 assessments based on student-selected subjects. Students pick six subjects, four of which are examined, depending on the chosen field in the second semester of Grade 11.

The main fields and required subjects (examined subjects only) are:

- Medical/Health: Chemistry, English, Biology, optional
- Engineering: Math, Physics, two optional subjects
- Technology: Math, three optional subjects
- Languages and Social Sciences: Specialized Arabic, Advanced English, two optional subjects
- Law and Legislative Science: Specialized Arabic, Specialized Islamic Studies, two optional subjects
- Business: Business Mathematics, Financial Literacy, Advanced English, one optional subject

Students who fail a Grade 11 subject may retake it in Grade 12 without affecting university eligibility.

Admission to higher education is determined by Tawjihi scores. Competitive fields, such as medicine and engineering, generally require high averages (typically 85% or above). The restructured Tawjihi program began in the 2024–2025 academic year; the first cohort under this system will graduate in 2026.

== Optional Subjects ==
Students may select optional subjects from the following list (no duplicates allowed):

- Mathematics
- Biology
- Chemistry
- Physics
- Geology
- Arabic/Specialized
- Islamic Studies/Specialized
- English Language/Advanced
- Science of Society and Psychology
- Business Mathematics
- Financial Literacy
- History
- Geography

All students are required to take "Digital Skills," which is examined by the school and does not count toward the four selected optional subjects.

== Jordanian Tawjihi Equivalency ==
Foreign secondary education programs such as the General Certificate of Education (GCE), SAT, and International Baccalaureate (IB) may be recognized as Tawjihi-equivalent. The Ministry of Higher Education converts foreign grades to Tawjihi-equivalent grades. Non-Tawjihi graduates compete under a 5% quota for public university places.

=== GCE/IGCSE/GCSE Equivalency ===
- Proof of 12 years of schooling required.
- Pass six O-level/IGCSE/GCSE subjects and two A-level subjects.
  - O-level/IGCSE/GCSE: A, B, C, D
  - A-level/AS: A, B, C, D, E
- Arab students must include Arabic at O or A level (Modern Arabic, First Language Arabic, or Arabic 9164). Arabic as a Second Language is generally not accepted.
- Science Stream requires:
  - Six O-level/IGCSE including two science subjects and one Arabic.
  - Two A-levels: mandatory (Math or Physics), optional (science subject).
- Literary Stream requires:
  - Six O-level/IGCSE including Mathematics and Computer Studies/IT.
  - Two A-levels: mandatory (Arabic), optional (literary subject or combination of literary/science).
- Two AS subjects equal one A-level for equivalency.
- Coordinated Science counts as two subjects.
- Final percentage calculated by summing eight subjects and dividing by 8: A*=98, A=95, B=85, C=75, D=65, E=55.

=== International Baccalaureate Equivalency ===
- Proof of 12 years of schooling required.
- Pass six subjects: Standard Level 3–7, Higher Level 4–7.
- Science Stream: 2 Group 1/2, 1 Group 3/6, 2 Group 4, 1 Group 5, at least 2 at Higher Level.
- Literary Stream: 2 Group 1/2, 2 Group 3/6, 1 Group 4, 1 Group 5, at least 2 at Higher Level.
- Equivalency calculation: each subject converted to percentage, averaged, plus 0.3% per diploma point.
  - 7=98%, 6=90%, 5=80%, 4=70%, 3=60%, 2=50% (fail at HL).

== See also ==
- Education in Jordan
- Education in Palestine
