= President of the University of Jordan =

- Seal of the University

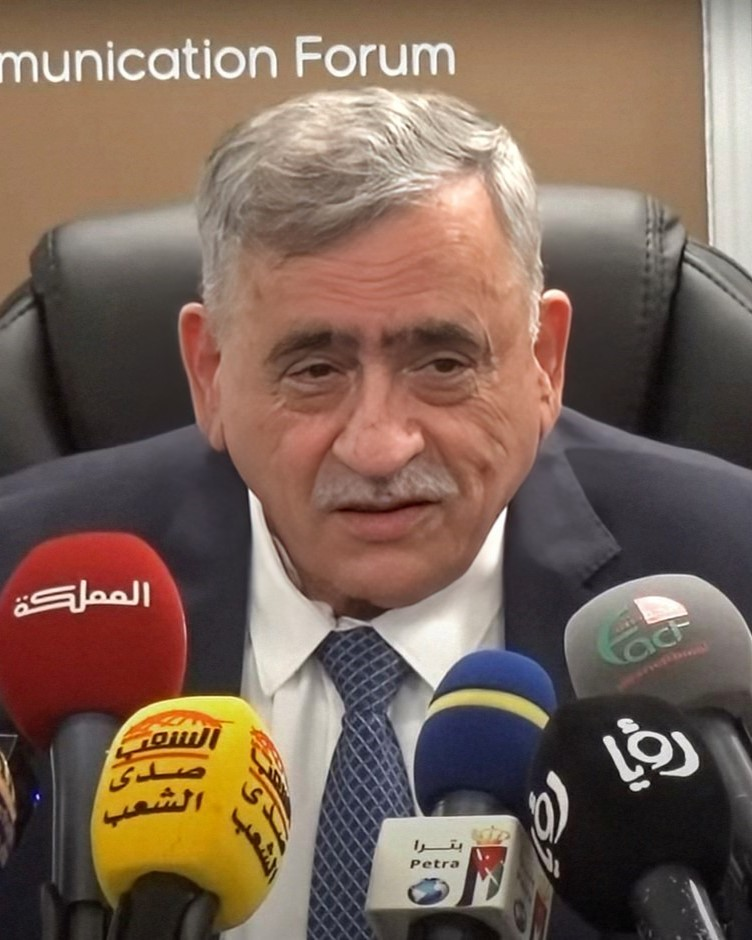
- Incumbent; Nathir Obeidat since August 4, 2021
- University of Jordan
- Formation: February 26, 1962
- First holder: Nasir al-Din al-Asad
- Website: ju.edu.jo/Lists/Adminstrators/Presidency.aspx/

The President of the University of Jordan is the head of the university and is responsible for its administration. The president is appointed by royal decree on the recommendation of the university's Board of Trustees. As the chief executive of Jordan's oldest public university, the president oversees an institution that includes campuses in Amman and Aqaba, more than 1,600 faculty members, over 50,000 students, and 25 schools.

The president's responsibilities include academic, administrative, and financial matters. The position includes authority over the implementation and approval of university policies and procedures, subject to the oversight of the Board of Trustees. The president also reviews general academic and administrative policies and oversees senior appointments, including those of vice presidents and deans. In addition, the president supervises the establishment and reorganization of colleges, departments, centers, institutes, and academic programs.

Independent background coverage of the main University of Jordan campus places it in the al‑Jubayha area of northern Amman along Queen Rania Street, and characterises the campus as a large site (described as about 120 hectares) that has expanded over time.

== Appointment and term ==
Jordanian university legislation provides that each university has a full-time president appointed for a four-year term, renewable once, and sets baseline eligibility criteria including Jordanian nationality and holding the rank of professor. For public universities, the president is appointed by royal decree based on the recommendation of the Council of Higher Education and selected from a shortlist of three candidates recommended by the university's board of trustees.

The same legislative framework describes how service ends (including at the expiry of term, accepted resignation, or death) and provides for removal and transitional arrangements, including a prohibition on leaving a university without a president for more than a defined period. In parallel, comparative governance briefs produced for international higher-education cooperation initiatives describe public universities as "autonomous to a large extent" administratively and financially, while noting that presidents are appointed by royal decree upon recommendation of the national higher-education council.

== Powers and duties ==
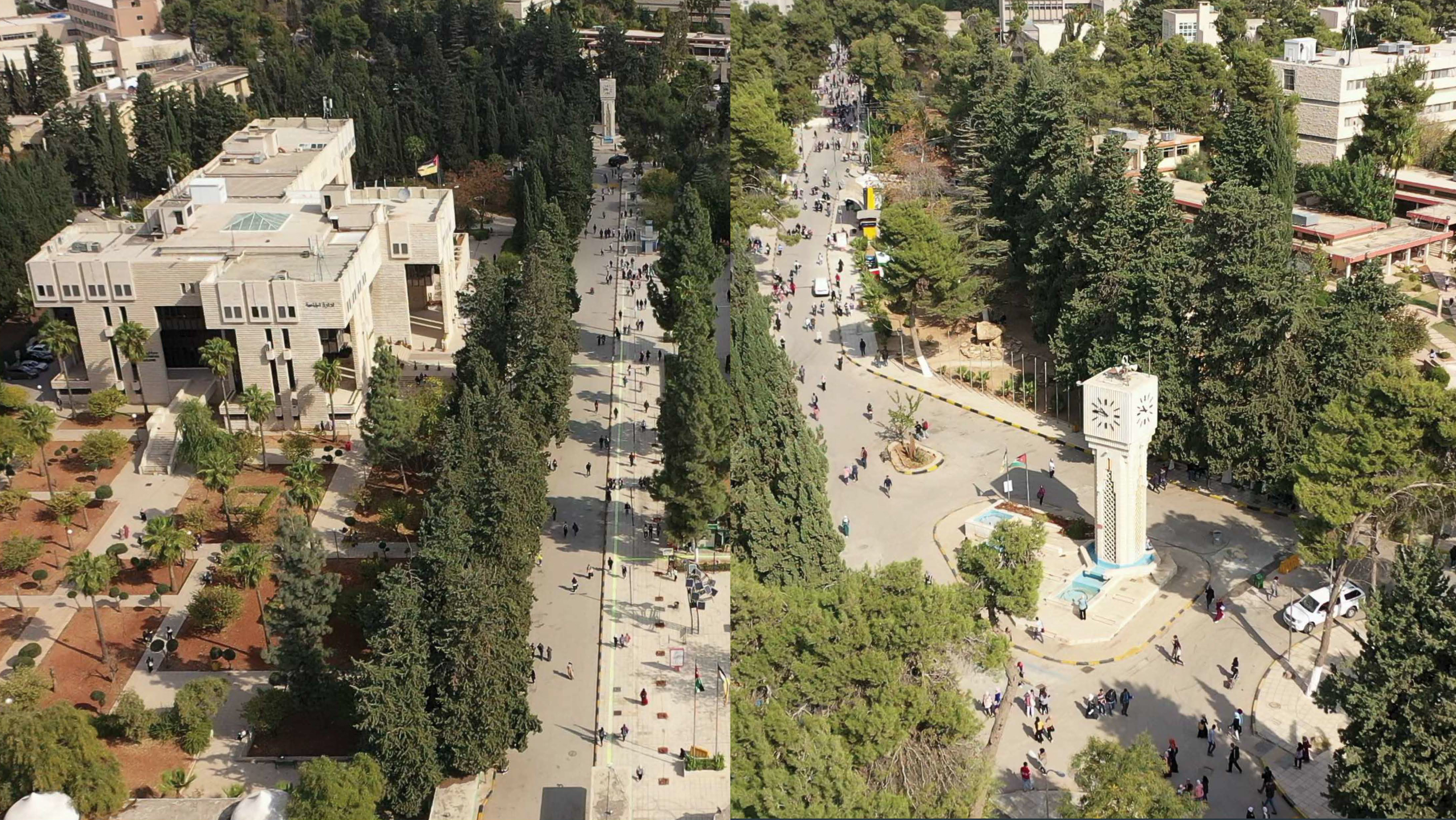
Aerial view of the campus

The president's responsibilities include policy oversight, staff management, external representation, and the handling of administrative issues at the university. The office also has a role in maintaining institutional standards and responding to major operational challenges. In addition, the president oversees senior appointments, including vice presidents and deans, and supervises the establishment or reorganization of colleges, departments, centers, institutes, and academic programs.

The president is responsible for approving the university's code of ethics, a founding document that guides ethical and behavioral standards within the academic community. His role extends beyond the campus, where the president serves as the official representative in various fields, including interactions with government bodies, appearing before courts, and participating in public and formal meetings.

As a member of the Board of Trustees by virtue of his position, the president's influence extends to faculty appointments, renewals, and terminations, thus playing a key role in shaping the faculty body.

In times of necessity or unexpected circumstances, the president has discretionary power to suspend classes partially or entirely. This ability to make swift decisions emphasizes the president's role as the ultimate decision-maker, ensuring the safety of the university community.

== Assistants and deputies ==
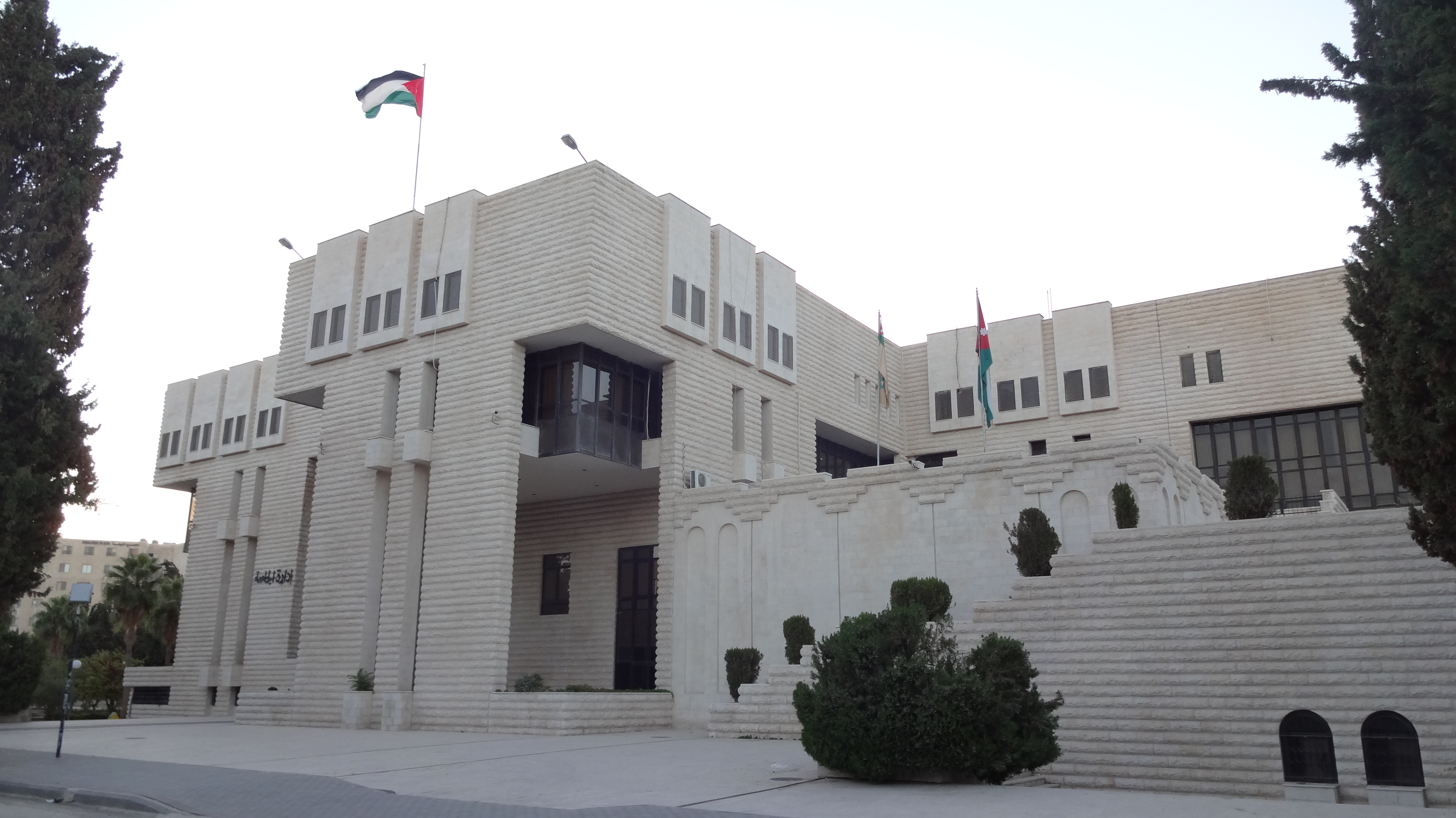
Presidency building, where the president's office is located

The president holds the highest position at the university and is at the top of the hierarchy, while the Vice President holds the highest levels within college groups.

Within the president's executive team, five main vice presidents play pivotal roles. Among them is the vice president for the humanities colleges, responsible for shaping the academic landscape in this field, while the vice president for the scientific colleges focuses on the complexities of scientific disciplines, ensuring their growth and development. The vice president for administrative affairs handles administrative matters, streamlining organizational efficiency.

Additionally, the vice president for planning, development, and financial affairs plays a critical role in guiding the university towards its strategic goals. Finally, the vice president for centers and community service, who also serves as the head of Aqaba branch, leads community engagement initiatives.

== List of University of Jordan presidents ==
The 15th and most recent president of the university is Nathir Obeidat, appointed in 2021. Of the previous presidents:

No.	Name	Portrait	Date of Appointment	Date of Completion	Duration of Presidency
1	Nasir al-Din al-Asad (First term)		February 26, 1966	August 20, 1968	2 years, 176 days
2	Abdulkareem Khalefah		August 21, 1968	August 15, 1971	2 years, 359 days
3	Abdelsalam Majali (First term)		August 18, 1971	June 10, 1976	4 years, 297 days
4	Ishaq Al-Farhan		June 10, 1976	April 6, 1978	1 year, 300 days
	Nasir al-Din al-Asad (Second term)		June 1, 1978	September 20, 1980	2 years, 111 days
	Abdelsalam Majali (Second term)		September 21, 1980	July 9, 1989	8 years, 261 days
5	Mahmoud Al-Samra		July 10, 1989	August 16, 1991	2 years, 37 days
6	Fawzi Gharaibeh		August 17, 1991	August 20, 1998	7 years, 3 days
7	Walid al-Ma'ani		September 20, 1998	January 15, 2002	3 years, 117 days
8	Abdullah al-Musa		February 11, 2002	December 2, 2004	2 years, 295 days
9	Abd al-Rahim al-Hunayti		December 5, 2004	May 30, 2007	2 years, 176 days
10	Khaled al-Karaki		May 31, 2007	July 27, 2010	3 years, 57 days
11	Adel al-Tuwaisi		September 15, 2010	February 1, 2012	1 year, 139 days
12	Ekhleif al-Tarawneh		March 25, 2012	March 16, 2016	3 years, 357 days
13	Azmi Mahafzah		April 16, 2016	June 14, 2018	2 years, 59 days
14	Abdel-Karim Al-Qudah		August 30, 2018	August 4, 2021	2 years, 339 days
15	Nathir Obeidat		August 4, 2021	Present	5 years, 34 days

== Post-Presidency ==
The president's service ends when his term expires, his resignation is accepted, or in the event of death. Removal from office is decided by the university council or board of trustees based on a justified recommendation. When the president's service ends, specific conditions apply. It is worth noting that a president who served at the university before his appointment is entitled to a severance pay and his financial entitlements are calculated based on his length of service at the university. Upon leaving office, the president retains the title of Professor.
