= University of Jordan Library =

Library in Amman, Jordan

- مكتبة الجامعة الأردنية

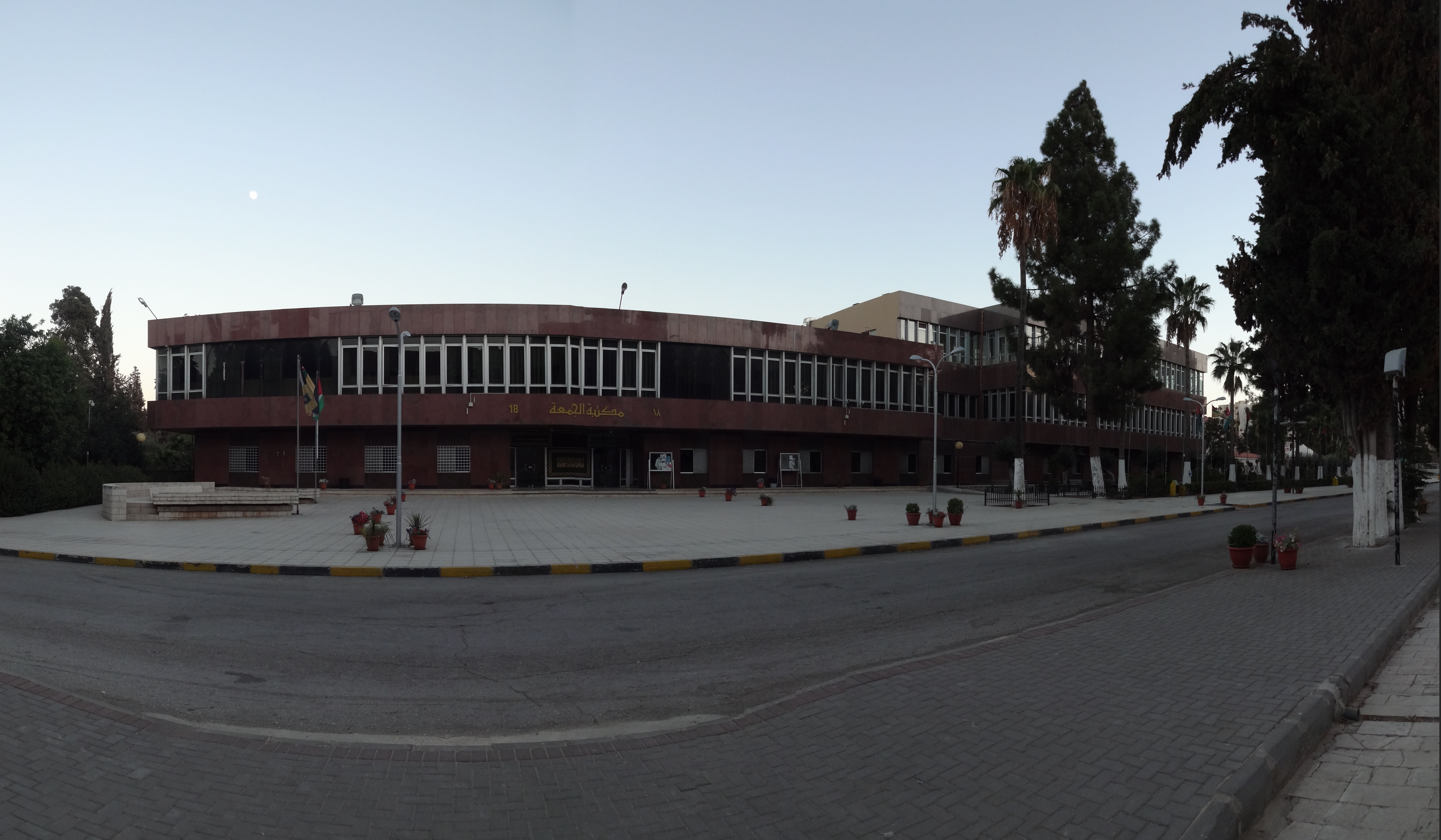
- UJL from the north side
- 32.015465°N 35.869943°E
- Location: Al Jubaiha, Amman, Jordan, Amman
- Established: 1962 (64 years ago)
- Branch of: University of Jordan

Other information
- Website: library.ju.edu.jo

The University of Jordan Library (UJL) (Arabic: مكتبة الجامعة الأردنية) is the main library of the University of Jordan campus in Amman, Jordan. It was established in 1962, the same year as the university. The library occupies about 12,000 m², with a further 4,000 m² of reading-room space distributed across faculty buildings and scientific centers. Its holdings exceed one million items in print and electronic formats, and its services are used by students, faculty, researchers, and visiting scholars. The library's mailing address is P.O. Box 11942, Amman, Jordan.

== History ==
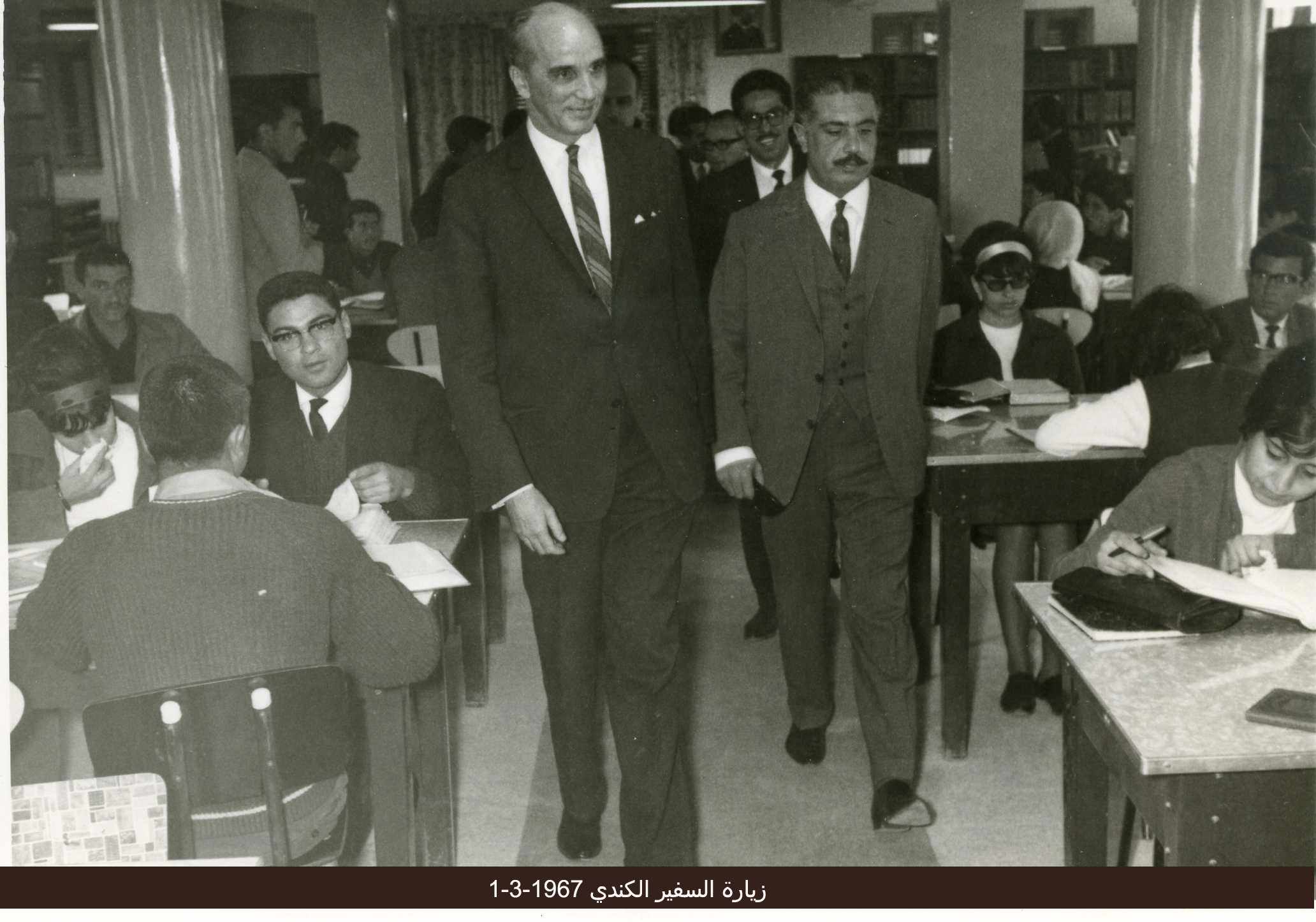
the university founder Nasir al-Din al-Asad walking with the Canadian ambassador to Jordan inside the university library on March 1, 1967.

The University of Jordan Library was established in 1962. Some sources describe it as the second public library in Jordan, after the Central Library (Arabic: المكتبة المركزية) (Public Libraries Department, Arabic: دائرة المكتبات العامة) founded in 1960. The library's collection is reported at around one million items, and it serves the university's students, faculty, and other users. Located on the University of Jordan campus, the library covers about 12,000 m² and provides seating for more than 2,000 users. A further 4,000 m² is allocated to 17 subsidiary reading rooms distributed across faculties and scientific centers.

The library is organized into three main departments. The Technical Department handles acquisition, indexing, and classification of new materials. The Library Services Department manages university dissertations, circulation, reference services, and deposits. The Information Department is responsible for library automation and for maintaining print and electronic periodicals. The library's mailing address is P.O. Box 11942, Amman, Jordan.

In September 2018, the library opened an American Corner after the unit was moved from the University of Jordan's Language Center. The American Corner is part of the U.S. Department of State's American Corners program, which operates a worldwide network of such spaces. It provides materials and activities related to the United States, supported by digital educational resources.

== Collections and Resources ==
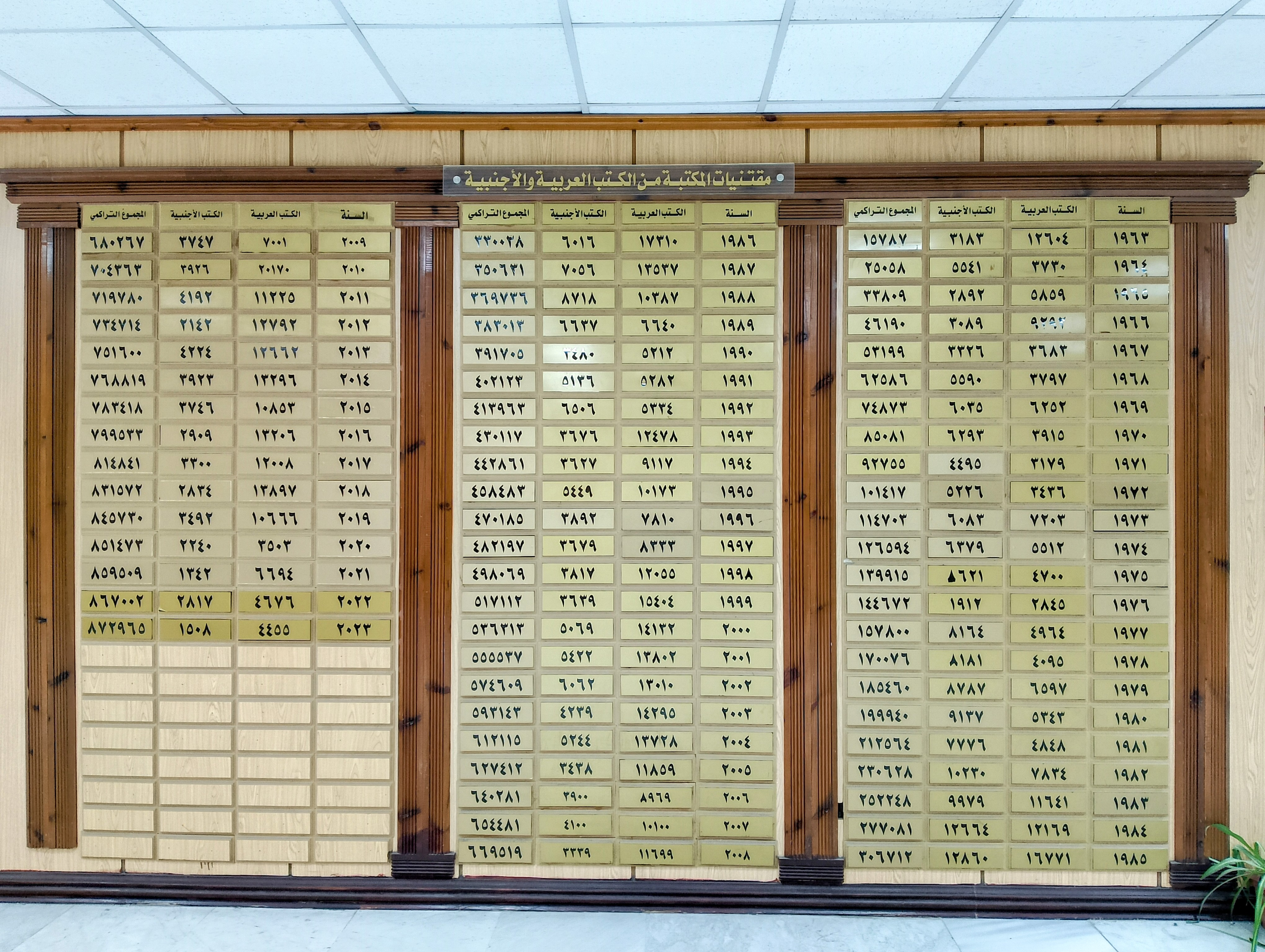
The UJL holdings from 1962 to 2023.

The University of Jordan Library holds more than one million items, including print and electronic resources, databases, and manuscripts. The collection supports the work of students, faculty, staff, and researchers, including visiting scholars.

The UJL maintains several archival and special collections. These include parliamentary records covering sessions from 1929 onward, and a newspaper archive reported to date back to 1870. The library also holds a Jerusalem-focused collection that includes Sharia court records and historical manuscripts described in the source as dating to 1530 from the Mamluk Sultanate, as well as serving as a depository for United Nations documents and publications from other international organizations.

=== Services ===
The library is open 90 hours each week and is reported to serve an average of about 11,000 users per day. Services include access to electronic theses, manuscripts, and the library's digital collections. It also provides assistive facilities for visually impaired students, such as screen-reading software, magnification devices, and Braille printers.

=== Special Collections and Archives ===
UJL features several notable collections:

- Heritage Collections: These include documents and books written on papyrus, parchments, and paper sheets by hand, reflecting the rich historical and cultural heritage of Jordan.
- Deposit Collections: Publications and studies related to Jordan, along with a special wing dedicated to the royal family, are part of this collection.
- Newspaper Archives: The library has archived approximately 5.5 million pages of newspapers, accessible electronically to facilitate research.

=== Theses Deposit Center ===
Since 1986, the University of Jordan Library has been accredited by the Association of Arab Universities as a repository for theses and dissertations from Arab universities. Its dissertations and theses database includes abstracts, bibliographic information, and—where available—full texts, with on-site access provided for complete content.
