= Education in Jordan =

General details
- Primary languages: Arabic & English
- System type: Public & Private

Literacy (2015)
- Total: 98.01%
- Male: 98.51%
- Female: 97.49%

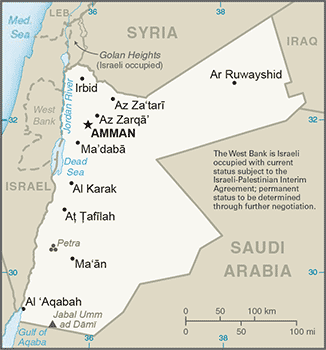
Map of Jordan

The education system of the Hashemite Kingdom of Jordan includes basic, secondary, and higher education and has dramatically evolved since the establishment of the state in the early 1900s. The role played by a good education system has been significant in the development of Jordan from a predominantly agrarian to an industrialized nation over time.

Jordan has the highest number of researchers in research and development per million people among all the 57 countries that are members of the Organisation of Islamic Cooperation (OIC); in Jordan there are 8,060 researchers per million people, while the world average is 2,532 per million.

In 2003, the share of budget dedicated to education was 6.4 percent of total government expenditure; education spending as a percentage of GDP was 13.5 percent in the same year. At 8.9 percent, Jordan has the lowest illiteracy rate in the Arab world (as of 2012). The primary gross enrollment ratio has increased from 71 percent in 1994 to 98.2 percent in 2006. The transition rate to secondary school, during the same period, increased from 63 percent to 97 percent and transition rates to higher education have varied between 79 and 85 percent of secondary school graduates. Along with these high enrollment and transition rates, Jordan has achieved a 97.89% gender parity in literacy by 2012, and full parity in primary and secondary enrollment by 2008.

Jordan is ranked 95 out of 187 in the Human Development Index. Despite strained resources, the Ministry of Education of Jordan has developed highly advanced national curriculum, and many other nations in the region have developed their education system using Jordan as a model. Jordan ranks number seven in the Arab World in education based on the global knowledge index.

The Ministry of Education (MoE) is responsible for the pre-primary, primary, and secondary levels of education. Post-secondary education is the responsibility of the Ministry of Higher Education and Scientific Research (MoHESR), which includes the Higher Education Council and the Accreditation Council.

The Human Rights Measurement Initiative (HRMI) finds that Jordan is fulfilling only 63.7% of what it should be fulfilling for the right to education based on the country's level of income. HRMI breaks down the right to education by looking at the rights to both primary education and secondary education. While taking into consideration Jordan's income level, the nation is achieving only 62.1% of what should be possible based on its resources (income) for primary education and 65.2% for secondary education.

== Education in Jordan ==
Jordan's education system is structured around a two-year preschool, 10 years of compulsory basic education, and two years of optional secondary education. Public schools offer free education to all citizens, with Arabic as the language of instruction and English as a mandatory subject for 10 years. The system also includes 2 universities operating under special law, 9 university colleges, 1 regional university, and 39 community colleges.

== Education Management System ==
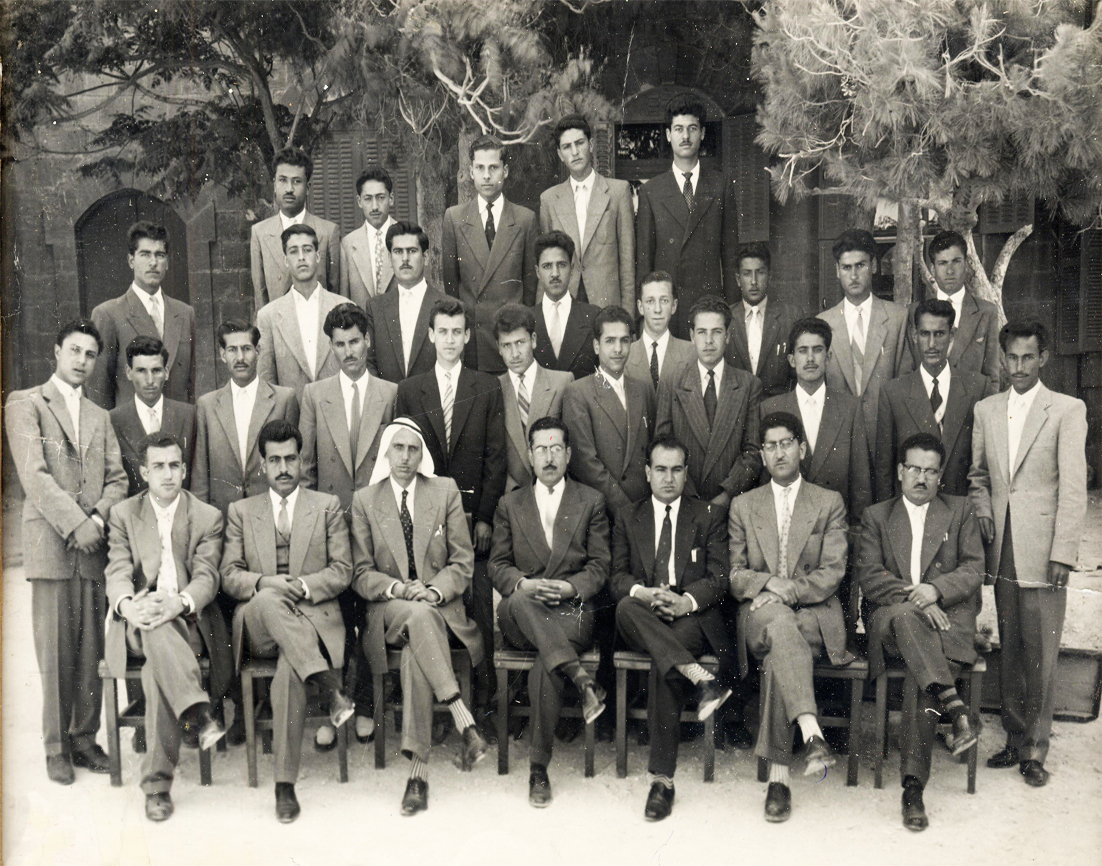
The fifth grade of secondary school at Salt School, it is the first school in Jordan.

The Ministry of Education (MoE) is responsible for the pre-primary, primary, and secondary levels of education. Post-secondary education is the responsibility of the Ministry of Higher Education and Scientific Research (MoHESR), which includes the Higher Education Council and the Accreditation Council. The MoHESR has outlined a National Strategy for Higher Education for the years 2007–2012.

Technical and Vocational Education and Training (TVET) at the post-basic level (excluding community colleges) as well as applied vocational education, administered by the Vocational Training Corporation (VTC), is under the authority of the Ministry of Labor.

=== School Education ===
The structure of the educational system in Jordan consists of a two-year cycle of preschool education, ten years of compulsory basic education, and two years of secondary academic or vocational education after which the students sit for a General Certificate of Secondary Education Exam (Tawjihi). Basic Education is free of charge, and so is secondary education in public schools.

==== Basic Education ====
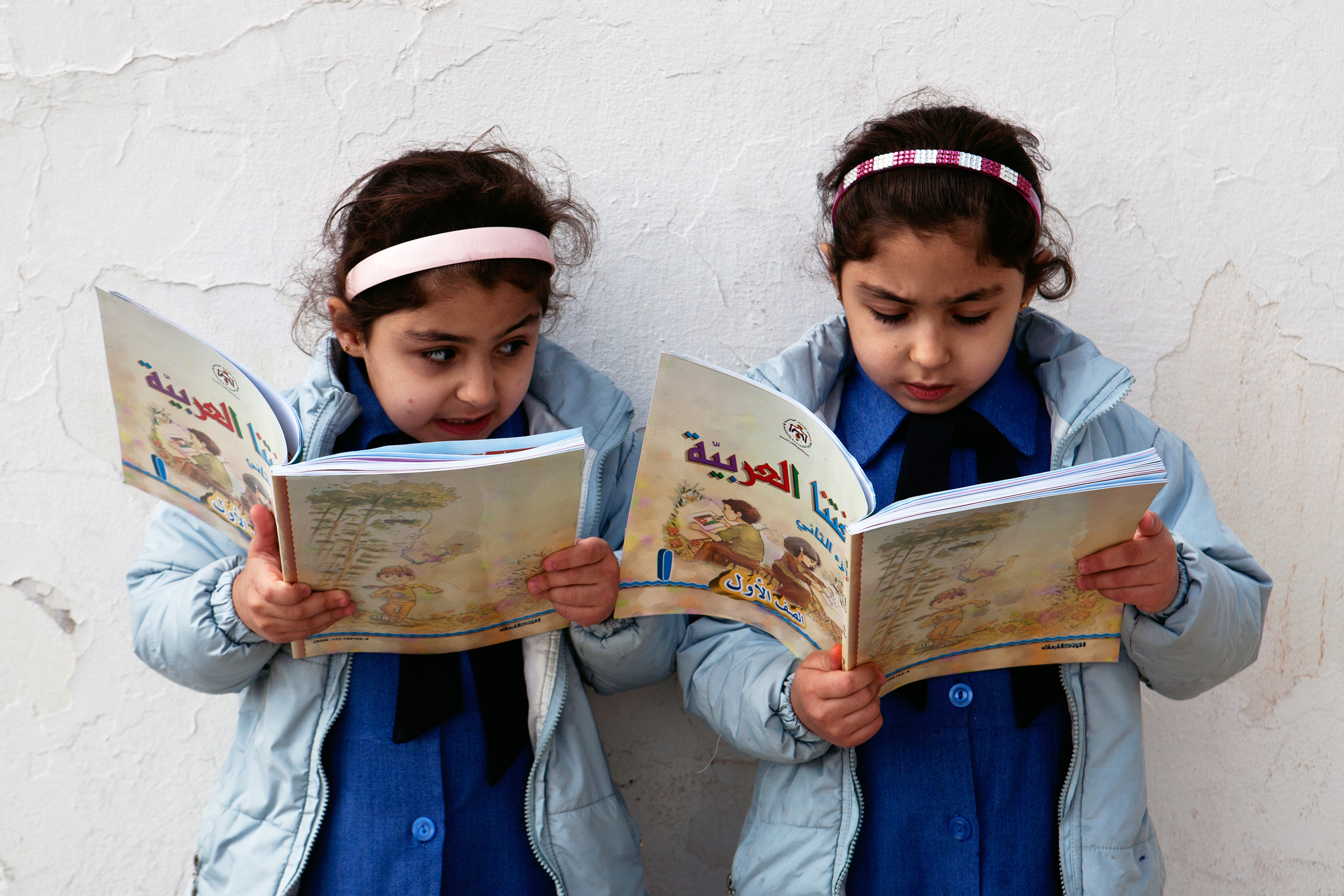
Young girls reading.

Basic Education is a 10-year compulsory and free level of education (grades 1-10). Study books are standard books distributed by the Ministry of Education. Education is compulsory for all through the age of sixteen.

More than half of the Jordan population is below the age of 30 years. About 42.2 percent are 14 years or younger, whereas 31.4 percent fall between 15 and 29 years of age; almost one-third of the Jordanians are enrolled in educational facilities. As of 2007/2008 the gross primary enrollment rate is 95.7 percent which is higher than the regional average of 93 percent. Jordan also ensures a high level of gender parity in access to basic services; the gender parity index for gross enrollment ratio in primary education is 0.98, better than other Arab countries. It is also one of the few Arab countries that have very small disparity in primary school attendance rates among urban and rural areas. This is mainly because public financing for basic schooling is more pro-poor than that for any other education level.

Schools in Jordan have two main categories, government and private. The private education sector accommodates more than 31.14 percent of the student population in the capital of Jordan, Amman. This sector is still heavily taxed, up to 25%++, although it takes a high burden off the government of the Kingdom, which makes school fees relatively high, starting at $1000, and going up to $7000. These values for private education fees are extremely high when compared to the average family incomes.

==== Secondary education ====
Students in this education level, choosing the scientific stream, are required to take nine subjects: Arabic, English, mathematics, computer studies, geology and environment, chemistry, biology, physics and cultural studies. While students choosing the classical stream, are required to take the following subjects: Arabic, Advanced Arabic, English, mathematics, computer science, and history. Islamic studies are also mandatory for all students except for Christian students. However that there are reforms planned to the secondary education system from 2020 onwards that might alter the streams available and the list of subjects. The secondary education level consists of two years' study for students aged 16 to 18 who have completed the basic cycle (ten years) and comprises two major tracks:

- Secondary education (managed by the Ministry of Education), which can either be academic or vocational. At the end of the two-year period, students sit for the general secondary examination (Tawjihi) in the appropriate branch and those who pass are awarded the Tawjihi (General Secondary Education Certificate). The academic stream qualifies students for entrance to universities, whereas the vocational or technical type qualifies for entrance to Community Colleges or universities or the job market, provided they pass the two additional subjects.
- Applied secondary education (managed by the Vocational Training corporation), which provides intensive vocational training and apprenticeship, and leads to the award of a certificate (not the Tawjihi). Practical training is made through apprenticeship, and not in school workshops as in vocational secondary education.

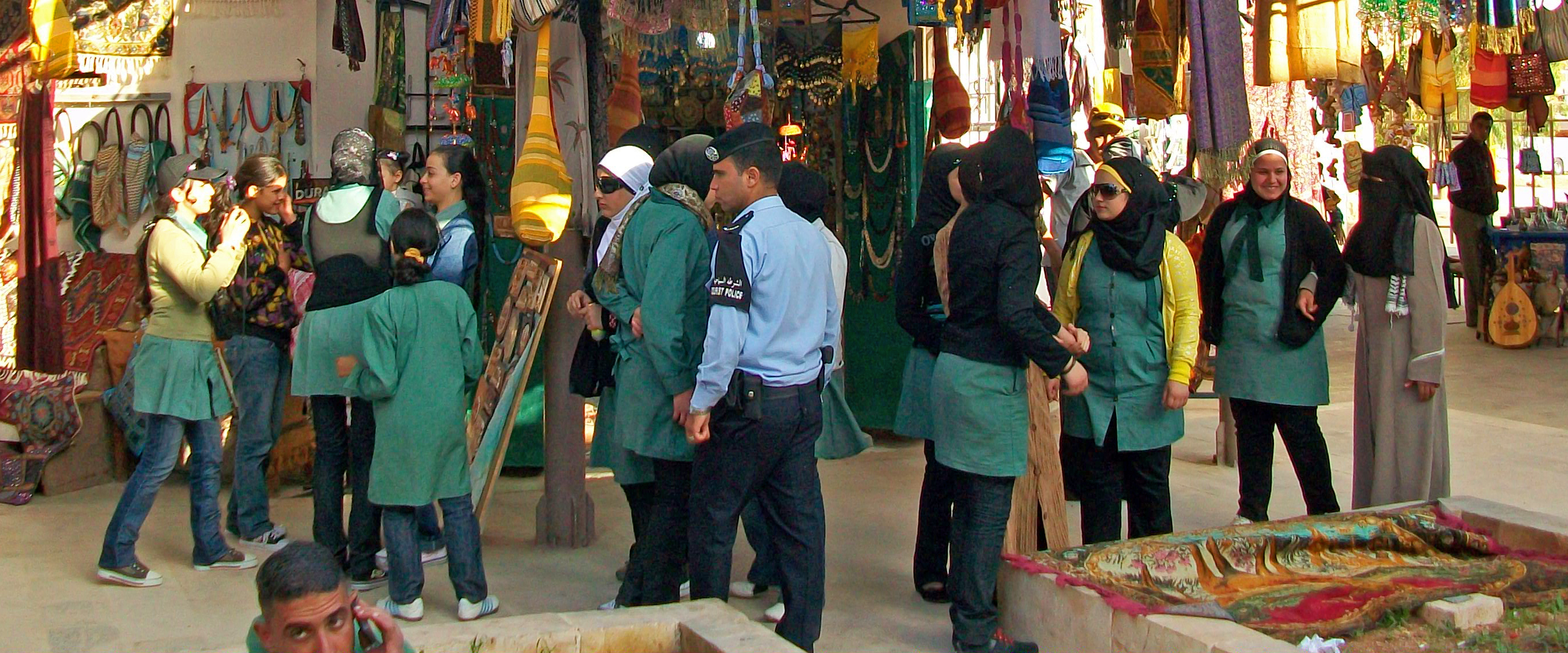
Female secondary students on a field trip to Jerash

Primary to secondary transition rate has reached 98.79% as of 2013, The enrollment in secondary vocational education as a share of total secondary enrollment declined from 18 percent in 2000 to 12 percent in 2005.

In international assessments, such as TIMSS and PISA, Jordan has performed well in comparison to other countries, Trends in International Mathematics and Science Study (TIMSS) Report in 2003 ranked Jordanian students' scores to be 22 points above international average in science and mathematics.

Since tertiary education is not free, the rate of transition to tertiary education is highly correlated with family incomes; there are 3 times more students at the university level from families in upper two income quintiles than those from families in the lower three.

=== Curriculum in Schools ===
The curriculum in Jordanian schools is structured to provide a comprehensive education that includes a variety of subjects designed to prepare students for both higher education and the workforce. Core subjects taught in Jordanian schools include Arabic, English, mathematics, science, and social studies. Arabic language and literature are central to the curriculum, reflecting the country's cultural heritage and the importance of mastering the national language. English is also a mandatory subject from the early grades, given its role as a global lingua franca and its necessity in higher education and business. Mathematics and science are emphasized to develop critical thinking and problem-solving skills, which are essential for students aiming to pursue careers in fields such as engineering and medicine. Social studies, including history and geography, are taught to foster an understanding of national identity and global awareness.

In addition to these core subjects, Jordanian schools also offer religious education, physical education, and information technology (IT). Religious education, primarily focused on Islamic studies, is a key component of the curriculum and is taught from the first grade. Physical education is included to promote health and well-being among students, while IT courses are increasingly important in equipping students with the digital skills necessary in the modern world. The materials used for these subjects are generally standardized by the Ministry of Education, ensuring consistency across public schools. However, private and international schools in Jordan often have more flexibility in their curricula, sometimes incorporating international standards and offering a wider range of subjects, such as arts and foreign languages beyond English.

Jordanian secondary school students generally display positive attitudes toward learning the English language. Notably, there is an absence of gender-based differences, both genders exhibit similarly positive attitudes toward English language acquisition. This indicate that students in Jordanian public schools, irrespective of gender, maintain a favorable outlook toward learning English. English is introduced as a compulsory subject starting in the first grade, with a structured curriculum designed by the Ministry of Education. The emphasis on English is not just about language proficiency but also about preparing students for higher education and the global job market, where English is often the medium of instruction and business. Despite the widespread teaching of English, there are disparities in the quality of instruction between urban and rural schools, with urban areas generally offering more resources and better-qualified teachers. This has led to a gap in English proficiency among students from different regions.

== UNRWA in Jordan ==
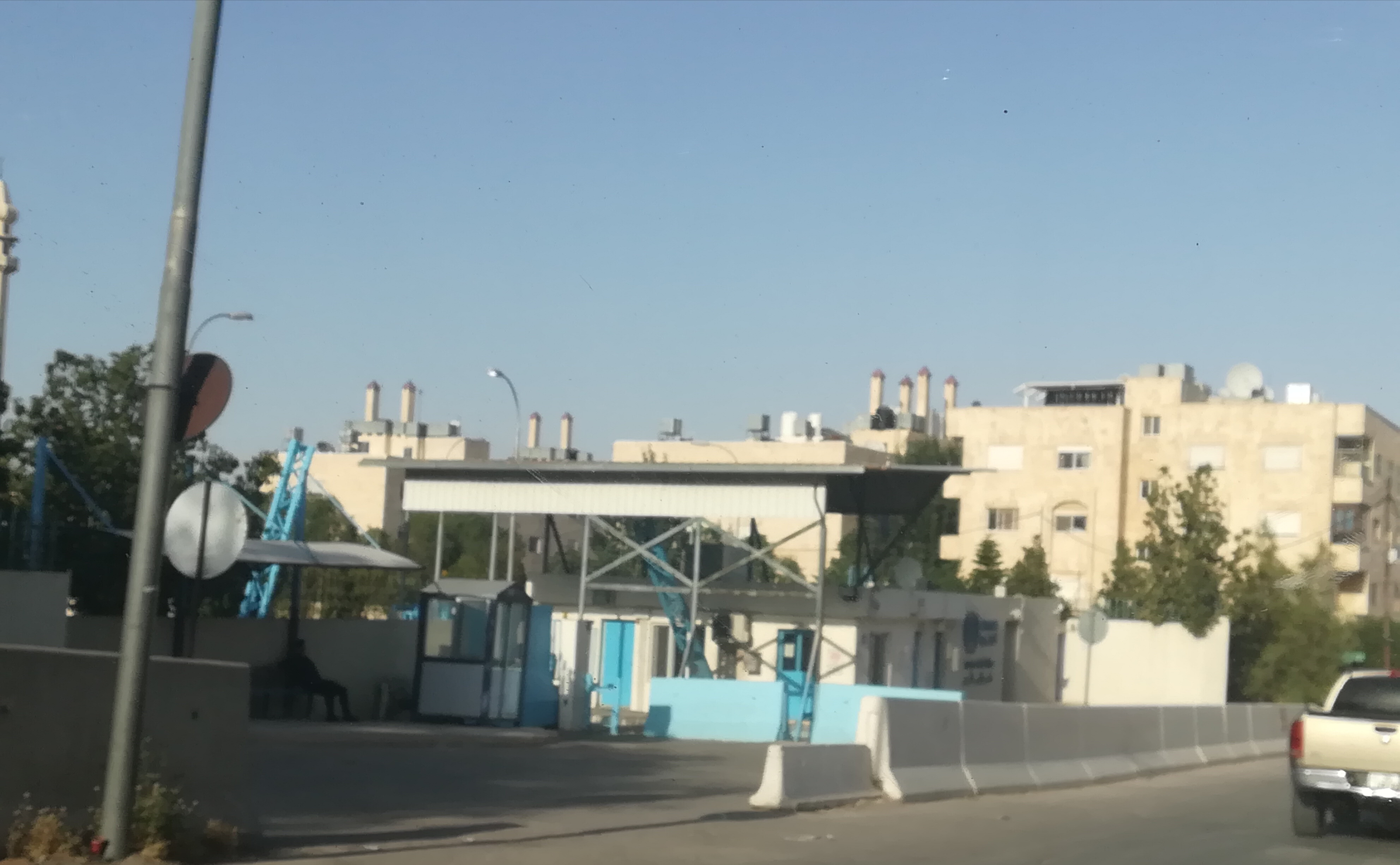
UNRWA in Amman, Jordan

The United Nations Relief and Works Agency for Palestine Refugees in the Near East (UNRWA) operates one of the largest school systems in the Middle East which has provided basic and preparatory education to Palestinian refugees for nearly five decades. The Agency provides basic education free of charge to all Palestinian refugee children in its area of operations, which includes Jordan. There are also vocational training courses provided in eight training centers, two of which are in Jordan, and have been in operation for the past four decades. The Agency has established an Institute of Education, which is headquartered in Amman, to provide training to the UNRWA teaching staff.

In Jordan, not all refugee children attend UNRWA schools. Most Palestinian refugees have access to government schools and many of them choose to send their children there. Most of the UNRWA schools run on more than a single shift. Approximately 83 percent of UNRWA elementary schools and 62 percent of UNRWA preparatory schools are operated in full double shifts. The Jordan Field has the highest percentage of double shift schools, averaging about 93 percent. The total refugee pupil enrollment in Jordan at various education levels is the following:

Total Refugee Pupil Enrollment in Jordan distributed by Education Level and School

School Authority	Elementary Level	Preparatory Level	Secondary Level	
UNRWA School	86,931	54,283	0	
Government School	38,180	25,938	2,943	
Private School	2,616	1,347	18,488	
Total	127,727	81,558	21,431	230,716

*Enrollment figures of refugee pupils in government and private schools are believed to be incomplete, since refugee pupils lack incentives to report their status if and when requested.

== Education Reform Efforts ==
The most recent education reforms started in the early 1990s. This reform process was accelerated under His Majesty King Abdullah II in early 2001 with a vision to make Jordan the regional technology hub and an active player in the global economy.

The National Vision and Mission for Education, as developed and endorsed in late 2002, states the desired direction for general education in the country. The two major consultative documents that helped shape the national vision and also set directions for educational reform initiatives were Jordan Vision 2020 and the 2002 Vision Forum for the Future of Education. These documents spanned kindergarten to lifelong continuing education. The overall strategy proposed by the Forum was endorsed by the Economic Consultative Council (ECC) in October 2002. The national development strategy and the Forum results were consolidated into specific development plans, the Social and Economic Transformation Plan, the General Education Plan 2003–08.

In July 2003, the Government of Jordan launched one of the most ambitious programs in the entire MENA region, a 10-year multi-donor Education Reform for the Knowledge Economy Program (ErfKE) for which the World Bank provided US$120 million. The goal of the program was to bring the country's educational policies and programs in line with the demands of a knowledge based economy, improve the physical learning environment in most schools, and promote early childhood education. The first phase of program lasted from 2003 to 2009, closing in June 2009.

The second phase of the ErfKE, which is aligned with IBRD and IFC Country Assistance Strategy (CAS) for the Hashemite Kingdom of Jordan, lasted from 2009 to 2015. The aim of this program was to strengthen and institutionalize the reforms introduced under ERfKE I, with a particular focus on school level implementation and teacher quality. It will strengthen the institutional capacity of MoE in policy, strategic planning, monitoring and evaluation, and improve teacher employment, utilization and professional development policies and implementation. The program also aimed to fine tune the curriculum and student assessment to ensure alignment with a knowledge based economy.

Jordan Education Initiative recently received the UNESCO prize for ICT use in Education. This pioneering educational project aims to utilize the power of information and technology with the proven methods of learning to transform the learning environment in schools.

=== Online Education ===
Darsak platform (درسك) is a Jordanian free-of-charge education platform that provides students with online video educational materials which is organized and scheduled according to the Jordanian educational curriculum. The platform aims to secure education for students from the first grade to the 12th-grade educational lessons through video clips whenever they don't have the access to the classroom.

The Ministry of Education has utilized Darsak platform to support the educational process and ensure its continuation during the COVID-19 outbreak by making the educational programs available through the platform.

== Higher education ==
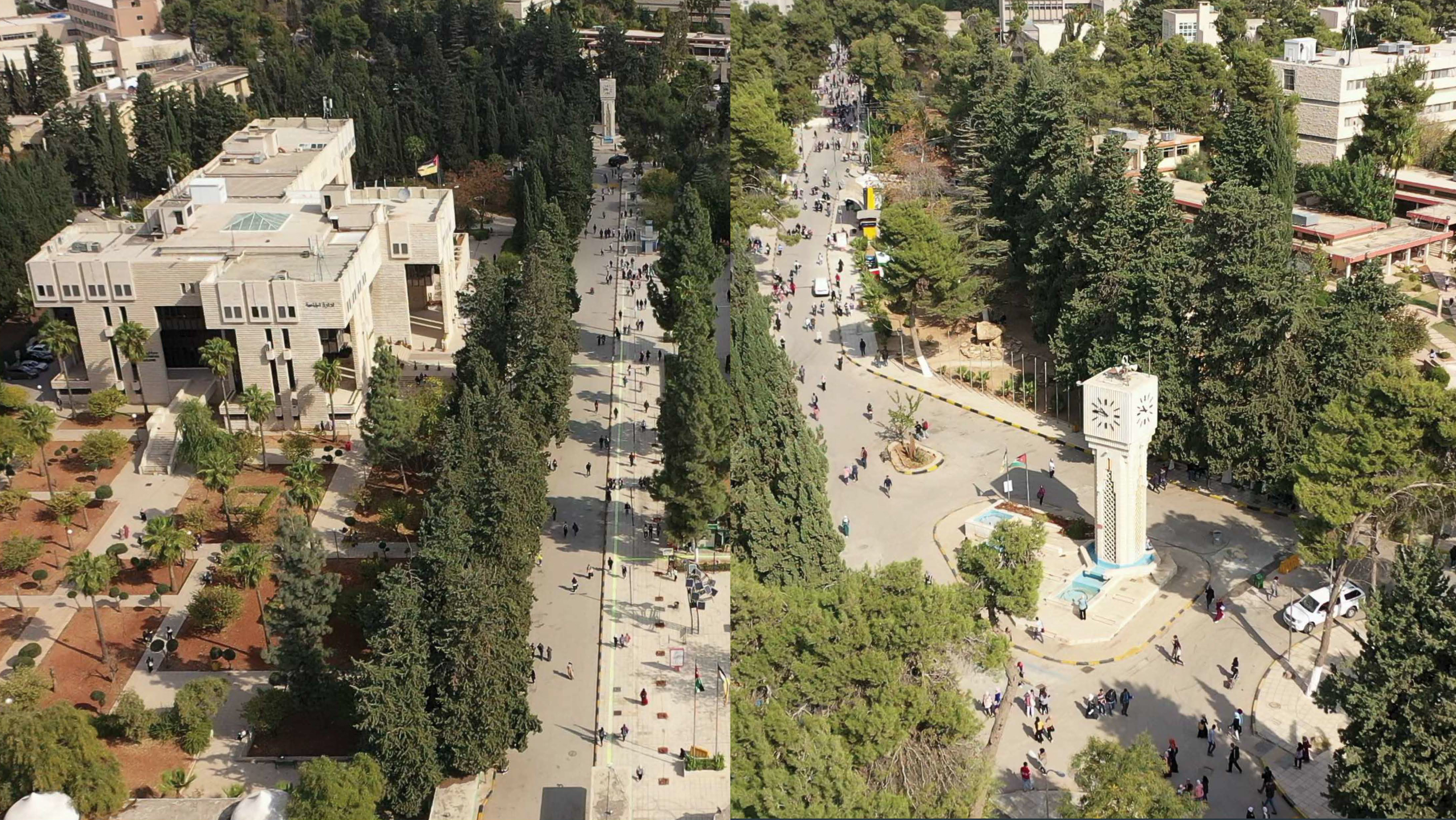
University of Jordan campus, Amman, stands as the first institution of higher education in Jordan, established in 1962.

Just over 2.5% of Jordan's total population is enrolled at university, a proportion comparable to the United Kingdom.

Access to higher education is open to holders of the General Secondary Education Certificate who can then choose between private Community Colleges, public Community Colleges, or universities (public and private). The credit-hour system, which entitles students to select courses according to a study plan, is implemented at universities.

The higher education system of the country has evolved considerably in recent decades. In years between 2000/2001 and 2006/2007, Jordan has seen an increased demand for higher education, with enrollments growing at an annual rate of 14% from 77,841 to 218,900 students in that time period. Jordan has tertiary gross enrollment levels of about 40%, which is higher than the regional average. Three new public universities have been established recently, reaching a total of 10 public universities in the country.

Eighteen out of twenty-eight total universities in Jordan are private, as of 2012/2013, and the vast majority of these are for-profit. Private universities account for 25% of Jordan's university student enrollment. Private universities have also seen a rapid increase in enrollments in recent years as public universities did. Since 2000 to 2006, enrollment in 12 private universities grew by about 18 percent annually from 36,642 to 55,744. However, enrollment numbers in community colleges declined from 30,000 to 26,215. This decrease in enrollment rates reflects growing preference for 4-year university education and also the fact that quality and level of training given in these colleges is not what is in demand in the labor market of a knowledge-based economy.

With increasing number of students going for the attainment of higher education, the government is seen by some as needing to allocate greater resources in improving the current higher education system and also to improve access of good universities for the rising population. Even the private universities have been called on to change some of their admission policies. The enrollment cap in the private universities restricts the ability of university to absorb increasing number of higher education students. Projection for the number of students entering university is 92,000 per year by 2013 up from 50,469 in 2005.

== Universities in Jordan ==
The Hashemite Kingdom of Jordan possesses systems of human resources of quality, competitive, efficient and capable of providing society with lifelong educational experiences closely related to its current and future needs, in response to and stimulating sustainable economic development by preparing educated individuals and a skilled workforce.

=== َUniversities in Amman ===
- University of Jordan
- Applied Science Private University
- German Jordanian University
- Al-Isra University
- Princess Sumaya University for Technology
- University of Petra
- Al-Zaytoonah University of Jordan
- World Islamic Sciences and Education University
- Middle East University (Jordan)

=== Universities in north ===
- Yarmouk University
- Jordan University of Science and Technology
- Irbid National University
- Jadara University
- Al al-Bayt University
- Philadelphia University (Jordan)
- Jerash University
- Ajloun National Private University

=== Universities in the south ===
- Mutah University
- Al-Hussain Ben talal University
- Al Tafilah University of technology
- University of Jordan in al aqaba

== University Level Studies ==
=== Standard pathway ===
==== First stage: Undergraduate level ====
Most universities in Jordan follow the English-American education systems and are associated with many American and English universities. Bachelor's Degrees normally take four years. In Dentistry, Pharmacy and Engineering, studies last for five years. In Medicine, they last for six years, followed by an Internship which lasts for one year. The bachelor's degree requires a total of 126-257 credit hours, depending on the field of study.

==== Second stage: Postgraduate level ====
A Master's degree is awarded after a further one to two years' study following a bachelor's degree. It can be obtained either by course work and a thesis (c. 24 credit hours of courses and nine credit hours of research), or by course work (c. 33 credit hours) and a comprehensive examination. There are other postgraduate degrees equivalent to the master's degree in some Jordanian universities like the Magister in the German Jordanian University, the DEA's degree in the Universities which follow the French system and the MBA for the students who have significant work experience.

==== Third stage: Doctorate ====
A Doctorate Degree is awarded after three to five years of further study and the submission of an original dissertation. It requires, depending on the subject, 24 credit hours of course work and 24 credit hours of research.

=== Teacher education: Training of pre-primary and primary/basic school teachers ===
Basic schoolteachers must hold a bachelor's degree. Training of secondary school teachers: Secondary school teachers must hold a bachelor's degree and a one-year postgraduate Higher Diploma in Education. Training of higher education teachers: They must hold a Doctorate (PhD). In some cases a master's degree is sufficient.

=== Non-traditional studies: Distance higher education ===
This type of education is offered at the newly established branch of the Arab Open University.

== Non-University Level Studies ==
Non-university and vocational studies are offered in community colleges, access to which is open to holders of all types of general secondary education certificates. The two-to three-year programme encompasses many fields, such as Arts, Science, Management, Business Administration and Engineering. As of 1997, all public Community Colleges are under the supervision of Al-Balqa Applied University. At the end of the two- or three-year course, students sit for a comprehensive examination (Al-Shamel). Those who pass are awarded the associate degree / Diploma.

== Lifelong Higher Education ==
Lifelong education is offered at public and private universities, public and private community colleges, the Jordan Institute of Public Administration, The Royal Jordan Geographic Center and The Royal Scientific Society, as well as in other institutions. Courses are offered in Engineering, Industry, Agriculture, Foreign Languages, Computer Sciences, Managerial Sciences, Secretarial Studies, Physical Education and subjects that can help the local community. Courses last between one week and six months at the end of which students obtain a Certificate of Attendance or Achievement. The qualifications required for admission depend on the subject and level of the course. Some are designed for specific occupations, in which case a work experience in the relevant field is needed to attend such courses, such as the books of Nadia Saqer.

== Challenges ==
Jordan, despite showing impressive improvement in the education system, continues to face persistent problems in this sector. With a rising youth population, the Jordanian government has to ensure that the quality of education and level of skills imparted can help the new generation to compete effectively on a national and international scale. Currently, the biggest challenge is the increase of population due to refugee influx, which has put pressure on Jordan's schools and universities. A recent school utilization study indicates that the number of Ministry of Education students is expected to increase by 124,634 between 2008 and 2013. To accommodate the rise in students, additional 3,360 classrooms will be needed during this time period. The same study reveals an uneven provision of educational infrastructure. In the Kingdom there exists concurrently excess capacity and wide-scale overcrowding of the schools.

== See also ==
- Jordan
- Ministry of Education (Jordan)
- Medical education in Jordan
- Demographics of Jordan
