= Mahmoud Al-Samra =

Jordanian academic and politician, Minister of Culture

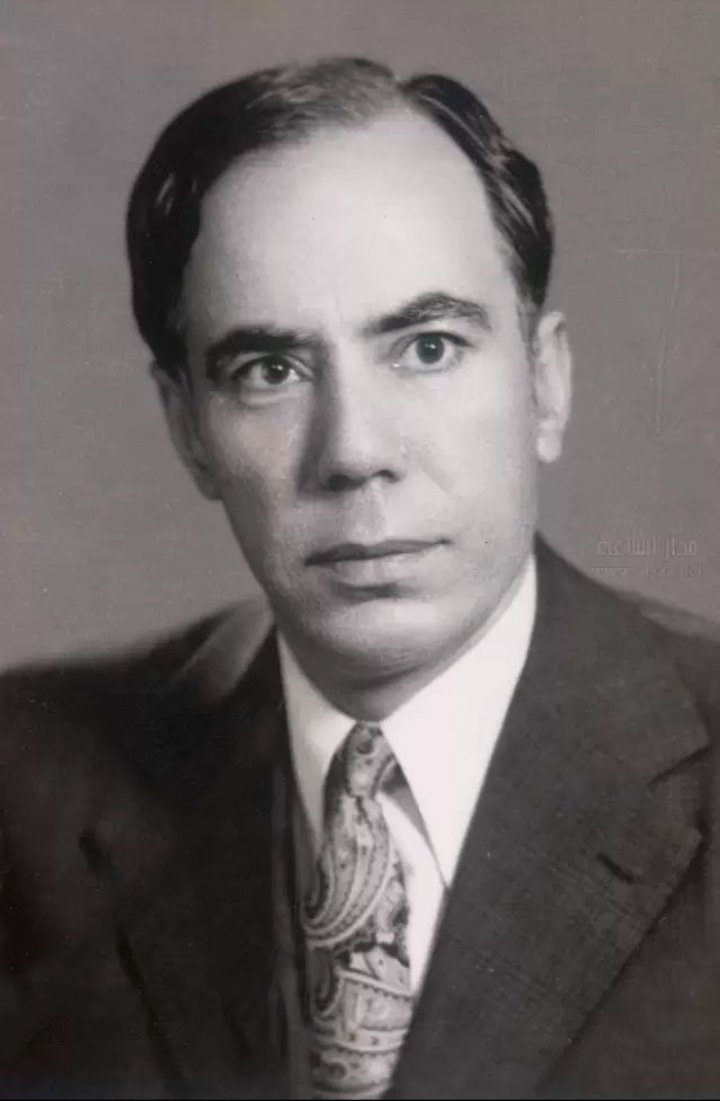

Minister of Culture of Jordan
- In office October 22, 1991 – May 30, 1993
- Monarch: King Hussein
- Prime Minister: Zaid ibn Shaker
- Preceded by: Khaled Al-Karaki
- Succeeded by: Amin Mahmoud

Personal details
- Born: April 20, 1923 Tantura, Mandatory Palestine
- Died: November 10, 2018 (aged 95) Amman, Jordan
- Education: University of London (PhD); King Fuad University (BA)

Mahmoud Daoud Sulaiman Al-Samra, محمود السمرة, (April 20, 1923 – November 10, 2018) was a Jordanian academic, academic administrator, and writer. Al-Samra served as the Jordanian Minister of Culture from 1991 until 1993. He authored more than 250 books, articles, research papers and other academic and literary works during his career.

Al-Samra was born in Tantura, Mandatory Palestine, in 1923. He received his Bachelor of Arts from King Fuad University (present-day Cairo University) in 1950 and his doctorate in philosophy from the Institute of Oriental and African Studies at the University of London in 1958.

He served as the dean of the Faculty of Arts at the University of Jordan from 1968 to 1973 and Vice President of the University of Jordan from 1973 to 1989. In 1989, he was appointed President of the University of Jordan and remained in that role until Fawzi Al-Gharaibeh succeeded him in 1991.

Mahmoud Al-Samra died on November 10, 2018, at the age of 95.
