= Nasir al-Din al-Asad =

Jordanian professor, diplomat and writer

Nāṣir al-Dīn al-Asad
- ناصر الدين محمد أحمـد جميل الأسد
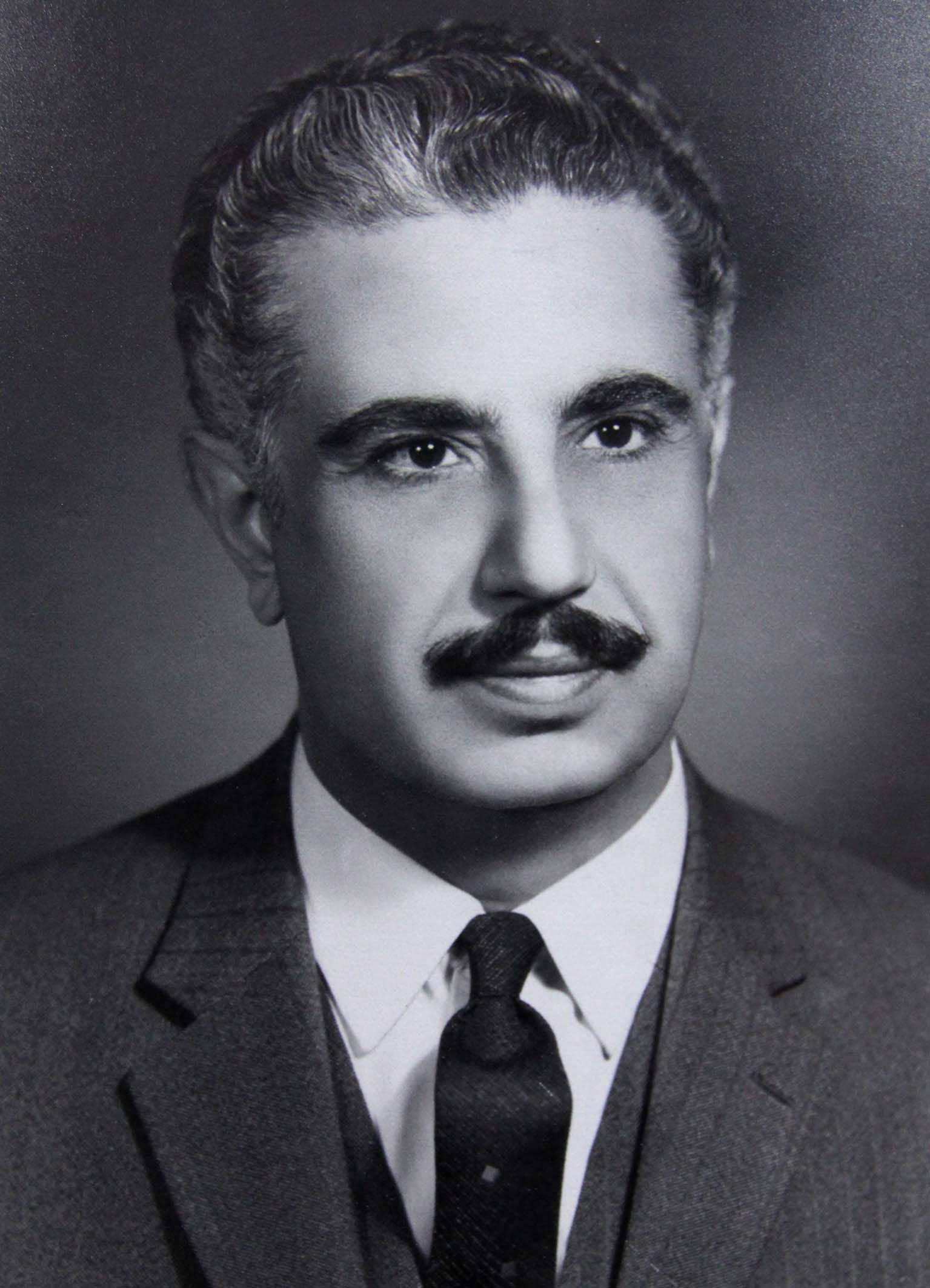
- Born: 1922
- Died: May 15, 2015 (aged 93); Amman, Jordan
- Occupations: Professor of Arabic literature, founder and president of the University of Jordan (1962-68), Ambassador of Jordan to Saudi Arabia (1977-78), and Minister of Education in Jordan (1985-89)
- Title: Professor of Arabic Literature, First President of the University of Jordan, Ambassador to Saudi Arabia, Minister of Education

Academic work
- Notable works: Masadir al-Adab al-Jaahili, Nasha'tu al-Shi'r al-Jahili wa Tatawuruhu - Dirasah fil Manhaj, Naqd al-Kitab fi al-Shi'r al-Jahili, Tahqiqat fi al-Lughat wal-Adab, Nahnu wal-Akhar Sira' wal-Hiwar

Nasir al-Din Muhammad Ahmad Jamil al-Asad (Arabic: ناصر الدين محمد أحمد جميل الأسد; born on December 13, 1922 – died on May 15, 2015) was a Jordanian writer, researcher, and literary critic, regarded as one of the most prominent figures in modern Arabic literature in Jordan and the Arab world. He contributed to the founding of the University of Jordan in 1962 and served as its first president, and served as Jordan's first Minister of Higher Education (1985–1989). Al-Asad was known for his seminal studies on pre-Islamic Arabic literature, particularly his renowned book "Sources of Pre-Islamic Poetry and Their Historical Value", in which he refuted the doubts surrounding the authenticity of pre-Islamic literature.

He was born in the city of Aqaba, Jordan in 1922 to a Jordanian father and a Lebanese mother. He pursued his university education and earned his Ph.D. with distinction from Cairo University in 1955. Al-Asad lectured at several universities and research institutes across Jordan, Libya, and Egypt. In addition to his academic career, he held high-ranking cultural and political positions, serving as a member of various Arabic language academies across several countries, as well as a diplomat and a member of the Jordanian Senate. His life spanned 93 years, marked by extensive scientific and cultural achievements, before dying in 2015, leaving behind a distinguished intellectual legacy in literary and critical studies.

In his doctoral dissertation, al-Asad was the first to direct a systematic critique against Taha Hussein and the school that adopted Hussein's methodology in the study of pre-Islamic literature. This came amidst the intellectual debates of the time, especially after Taha Hussein published his controversial book On Pre-Islamic Poetry, where he questioned the authenticity of many sources of pre-Islamic poetry. Under the supervision of Professor Shawqi Daif, al-Asad’s dissertation firmly established the authenticity and antiquity of pre-Islamic poetry. His dissertation culminated in a comprehensive and authoritative book in which he meticulously explored the subject, addressing every relevant aspect and framing each part within its appropriate research context. Al-Asad reviewed and objectively discussed various opinions regarding pre-Islamic poetry before articulating his own viewpoint. Although al-Asad relied on external evidence, contrasting with Taha Hussein's focus on internal evidence in textual analysis, his work was considered one of the most powerful and comprehensive rebuttals to Hussein’s arguments. This intellectual divergence ultimately led to academic and literary disputes between the two figures, but these disagreements eventually gave way to a strong friendship that lasted until Taha Hussein’s death.

== Early life and education ==
Nasir al-Din al-Asad was born on December 13, 1922, in the Jordanian city of Aqaba overlooking the Red Sea. His father, Muhammad Ahmad Jamil al-Asad, participated in the Arab Revolt and served alongside Emir Faisal ibn Hussein during World War I, later moving to work in trade in Amman after the end of the revolt. His mother, Mary Grace Shu'ayya, was a Lebanese woman from the Maronite Church, who converted to Islam upon her marriage and took the name Amina bint Abdullah. Al-Asad grew up in a Bedouin environment in the deserts of Aqaba and southern Jordan, and from an early age, he was influenced by the desert's atmosphere, language, and poetry. He received his primary education locally and continued his intermediate and secondary studies in southern Jordanian towns (such as Shobak and Wadi Musa) and later in Amman.

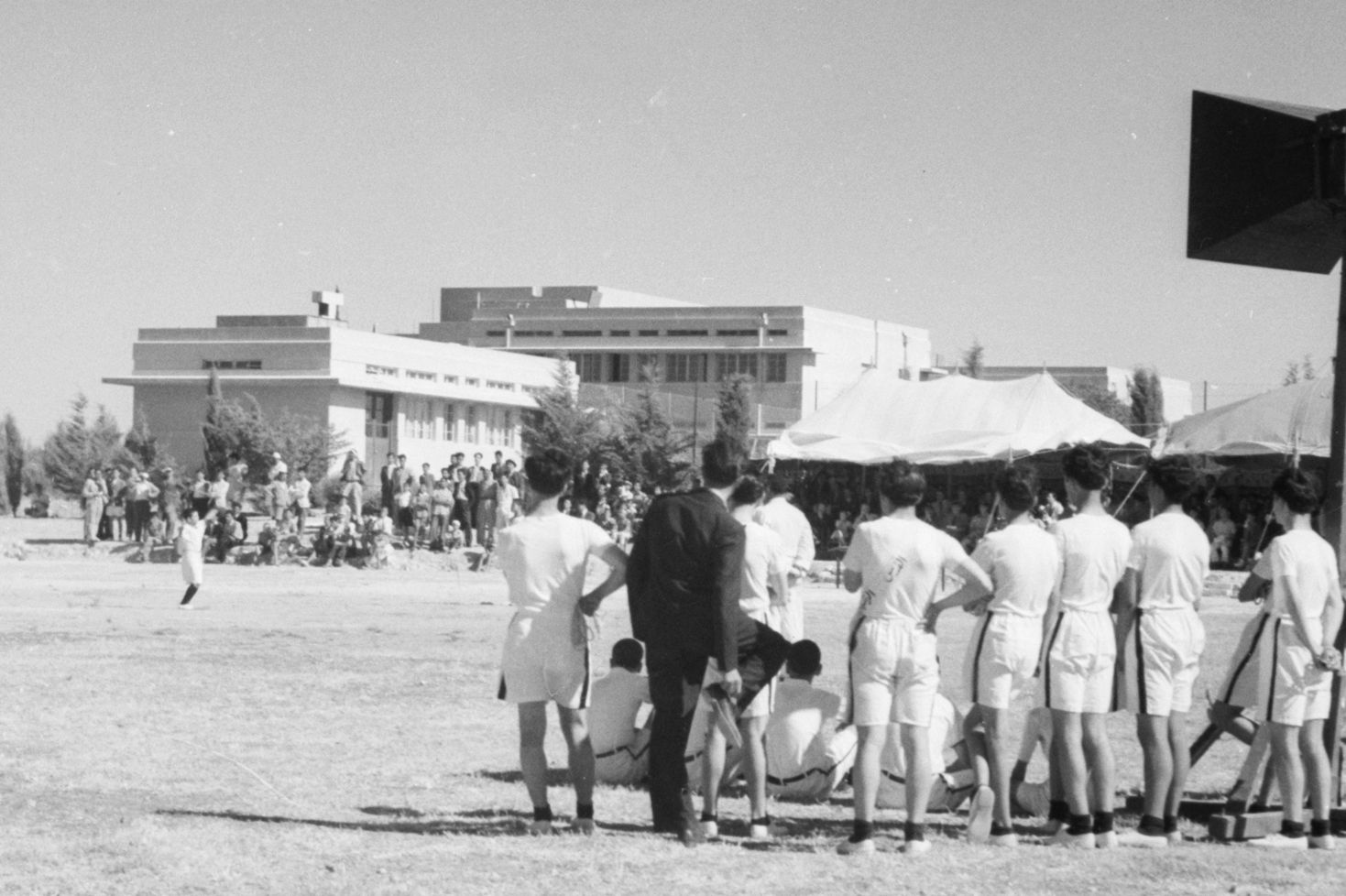
The Arab College in Jerusalem, where Nasir al-Din al-Asad completed his secondary education

His literary interests appeared early due to his extensive reading, which granted him a broad cultural knowledge and mastery of classical Arabic. While studying in Amman, he was mentored by prominent literary figures such as the poet Kazem al-Khalidi, the poet Abdel Monem al-Rifa'i, and the writer Saeed al-Durra; these influences nurtured his passion for Arabic literature, both classical and modern.

In 1939, Al-Asad joined the Arab College in Jerusalem to complete his secondary education on a scholarship, marking his first time experiencing a major city outside his birthplace. He graduated from the Arab College in 1943, which was then the leading educational institution in Palestine and Jordan. There, he studied under leading scholars like Ishaq Musa al-Husseini, Ahmad Samih al-Khalidi, and historian Nicolas Ziadeh. Among his classmates were future notable figures from the Levant and the Gulf, including Jabra Ibrahim Jabra and Mahmoud Ali al-Ghoul. Later, he would study and teach alongside contemporaries such as Ihsan Abbas, Mahmoud al-Samra, Hashem Yaghi, and Abdul Rahman Yaghi at the University of Jordan.

During this period, al-Asad was struck by personal tragedy: he lost his mother in 1936 and his father in 1939, during his final year of secondary school. Forced to assume responsibility at a young age, he worked briefly as a clerk in the office of the Chief Islamic Judge and the Sharia Court in Amman to support himself until he completed his education. After obtaining his secondary school certificate, he returned to Amman and worked for a short time as a schoolteacher. An opportunity later arose for him to pursue higher education, and in 1944 he traveled to Egypt, enrolling at Fouad I University (now Cairo University). There, he studied in the Faculty of Arts, Department of Arabic Language, under the tutelage of towering intellectuals including Taha Hussein, Amin al-Khouli, Abbas Mahmoud al-Aqqad, and Dr. Shawqi Daif.

Nasir al-Din al-Asad earned his licentiate (bachelor's degree) in Arabic language from Cairo University in 1947 with high distinction, becoming the first Jordanian to graduate from this prestigious institution. In the same year, he received the Taha Hussein Prize in Egypt, awarded for academic excellence, a prize named after his professor and awarded to outstanding students. He continued his graduate studies at Cairo University, obtaining his master's degree in 1951, and later his Ph.D. in 1955 under the supervision of Dr. Shawqi Daif. His doctoral dissertation, titled Sources of Pre-Islamic Poetry and Their Historical Value, was defended during Taha Hussein's absence while he was on leave. He graduated with honors, becoming the first Jordanian to earn a doctorate from Cairo University.

== Personal life ==
Little has been revealed about Nasir al-Din al-Asad’s personal life. It is said that he married during his time studying in Egypt, in late 1947, shortly before obtaining his licentiate degree. His wife’s name is unknown, but it is certain that they had several sons and daughters. Among his children is the engineer Bashar, who is also known as Engineer Nasir al-Din al-Asad (named after his father), and among his daughters is Sulafa al-Asad, who married the physician Mo’men al-Hadidi.

Al-Asad was known for his commitment to a quiet family life, always dedicating time to his family despite his scholarly obligations. In his later years, he donated his vast personal library to the University of Jordan's library, amounting to around 21,000 books and manuscripts, with his children retaining only a few volumes of sentimental and historical value (including a rare 1926 edition of Taha Hussein’s On Pre-Islamic Poetry). Personally, Nasir al-Din al-Asad was characterized by deep humility, simple living, generosity, and elegant appearance. He was known for his gentle manners and his constant warm smile. He was particularly noted for his strict adherence to the use of Modern Standard Arabic in both speech and lectures, earning him nicknames such as "the youthful octogenarian" for his continued vitality and stylistic elegance in old age, and "the gentle lion" for his calmness and politeness despite his strong-sounding surname. It is said that he was so committed to the Arabic language that he would gently correct any linguistic mistakes he heard during formal gatherings. These personal qualities earned him widespread respect in both academic and social circles.

== Career ==
After completing his higher studies, Nasir al-Din al-Asad began his professional career in academia and teaching. He worked as a lecturer at Cairo University and at Arab institutions such as the Institute of Arab Research and Studies in Cairo during the mid-1950s. During his time in Egypt, he regularly attended the literary salons of major figures like Taha Hussein, Abbas Mahmoud al-Aqqad, and Mahmoud Mohamed Shaker, which allowed him to become deeply involved in the elite Arab intellectual circles of the time. From 1954 to 1959, al-Asad was appointed Deputy Director of the Cultural Affairs Department at the Secretariat General of the Arab League in Cairo, actively participating in Arab cultural coordination efforts during the post-independence era.

In 1959, al-Asad moved to Libya, where he served as Dean of the Faculty of Arts and Education at the University of Libya in Benghazi from 1959 to 1961. There, he contributed to the development of university curricula and laid the foundations for scientific research in the field of Arabic language and literature. In 1962, he returned to Jordan at the invitation of King Hussein bin Talal to help establish the University of Jordan (the first university in the country). Al-Asad played a pivotal role in founding the University of Jordan and setting its academic structure, serving as its first president from its establishment in 1962 until 1968. During his initial presidency, he recruited a distinguished cadre of Arab professors and established solid academic traditions, making the university a cornerstone of higher education in Jordan. After completing his first term, he was reappointed as president between 1978 and 1980 to continue leading the university’s development.

In addition to his university work, al-Asad continued his contributions to Arab cultural efforts. He served as the Supervisor of Cultural Affairs at the Arab League Educational, Cultural and Scientific Organization (ALECSO) between 1968 and 1977, overseeing programs aimed at cultural and educational renaissance across the Arab world. He was also appointed as Jordan’s ambassador to the Kingdom of Saudi Arabia between 1977 and 1978, utilizing his intellectual stature to strengthen cultural relations between the two countries.

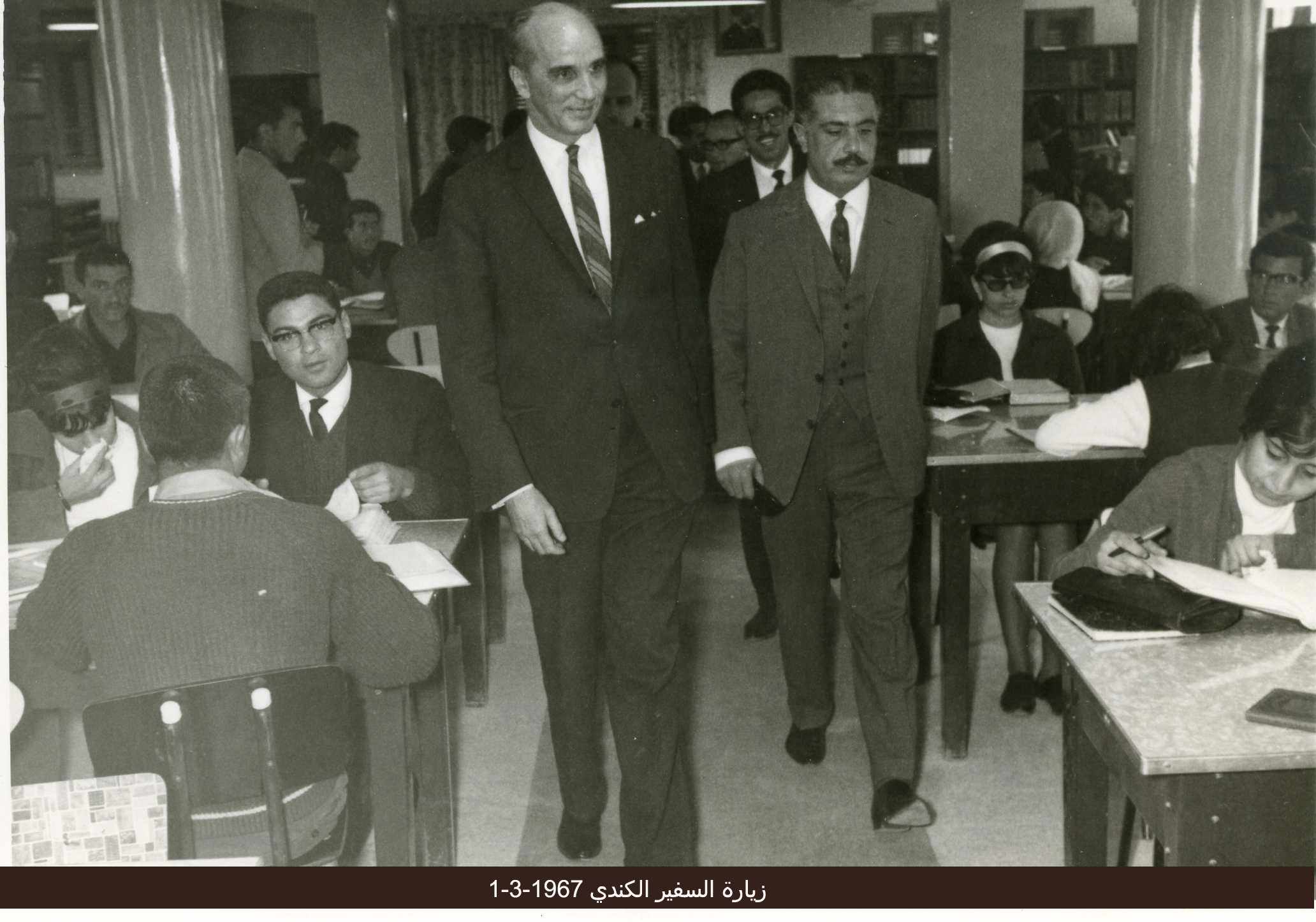
Nasir al-Din al-Asad and the Canadian ambassador at the University of Jordan Library

In 1985, al-Asad entered public service as a minister, assuming the portfolio of the newly established Ministry of Higher Education and Scientific Research (Jordan), becoming its first minister and serving until 1989.

During his tenure, he worked to develop university education policies, establish new universities, and promote scientific research. After leaving the ministry, al-Asad remained active in academic circles, serving as President of Al-Ahliyya Amman University (one of Jordan’s first private universities) between 1991 and 1993, and later as a member of the Jordanian Senate (the upper house of the Jordanian Parliament) from 1993 to 1997, where he contributed his expertise to the education and culture committees.

Nasir al-Din al-Asad was a member of several prestigious Arab and international academic institutions. He was selected as a member of the Academy of the Arabic Language in Cairo, the Academy of the Arabic Language in Damascus, and the Jordan Academy of Arabic (of which he was a founding member). He was also a correspondent for the Indian Arabic Scientific Academy in Aligarh, India, since 1976, a member of the Academy of the Kingdom of Morocco, and a member of the Board of Trustees at Al-Isra University in Amman, as well as the Board of Trustees of the Abdul Hameed Shoman International Prize for Jerusalem. Additionally, he chaired the Board of Trustees of the Royal Aal al-Bayt Institute for Islamic Thought (the Royal Institute for Islamic Civilization Research) in Amman for two decades (1980–2000), through which he supported numerous research projects in Islamic law and history. He also chaired the Board of Trustees of the Palestine Encyclopedia and the Royal Committee for Jerusalem Affairs, demonstrating his active role in intellectual and national causes.

== Literary and intellectual career ==
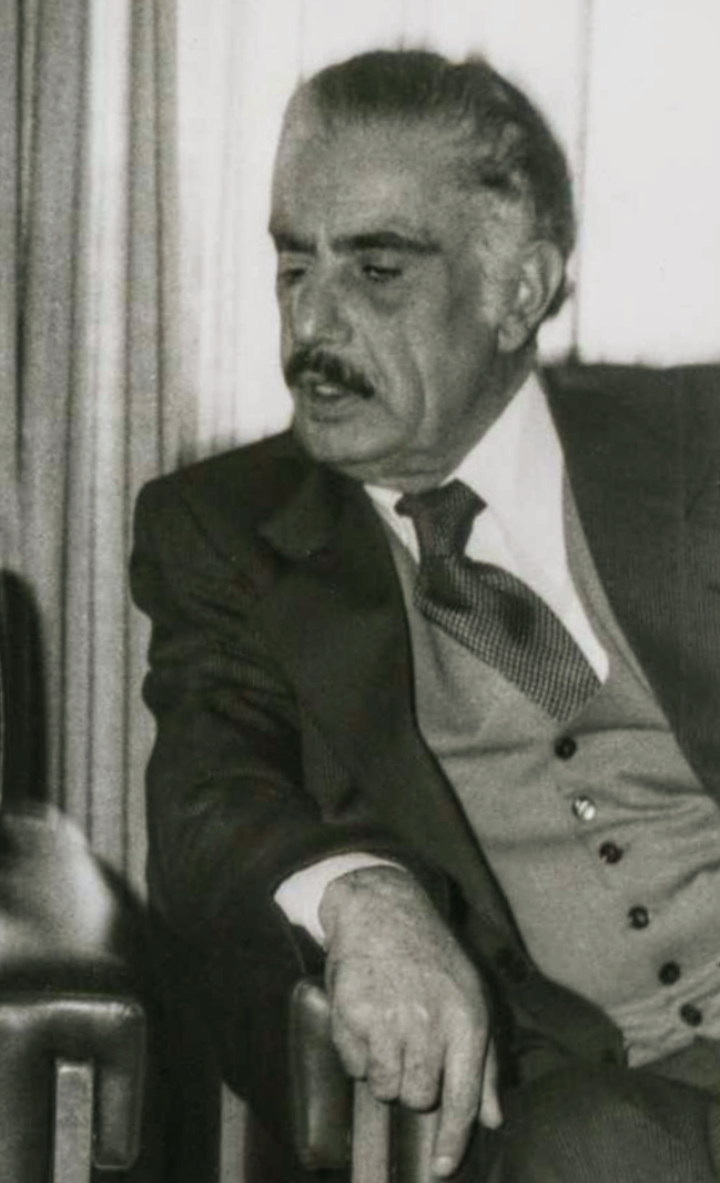
Nasir al-Din al-Asad in the 1960s at his office in the University of Jordan.

Nasir al-Din al-Asad is considered a leading figure in the field of Arabic literary and critical studies, combining in his career the methodology of modern academic research with a deep loyalty to the heritage of classical Arabic literature. In his youth, he was influenced by his teachers, the pioneers of the Arab literary renaissance; he was a student of Taha Hussein and was influenced by his historical-critical approach, though he later adopted independent views marked by greater precision and objectivity compared to his mentor.

This independence became especially clear in his famous study on pre-Islamic poetry, where he presented a perspective that differed from some of Taha Hussein's theses, supported by scientific evidence and systematic analysis. Taha Hussein himself later praised his student's objectivity despite their differences in viewpoints.

Al-Asad concentrated his research efforts on the fields of Arabic literature in the pre-Islamic era, the early Islamic period, and modern times. In his study Sources of Pre-Islamic Poetry and Their Historical Value (published in 1956), he conducted a meticulous examination of both written and oral sources of pre-Islamic poetry, demonstrating with credible evidence that a significant portion of this poetry was recorded during or shortly after its own time, thereby refuting claims of fabrication raised by the Orientalist David Margoliouth and adopted by Taha Hussein in his book On Pre-Islamic Poetry. Al-Asad did not initially intend to refute Taha Hussein in his dissertation, but rather aimed to establish a foundational study on Arabic poetry of that time. Nevertheless, their scholarly disputes escalated into lively literary debates, which eventually evolved into a genuine friendship lasting until Taha Hussein’s death. Since its publication, al-Asad's book has remained an indispensable reference for researchers in pre-Islamic literature for decades. His methodology in this work was distinguished by originality and strict academic rigor, relying on the investigation of historical accounts of poetry, critical examination of their authenticity, and detailed analysis of pre-Islamic society and culture to demonstrate that ancient Arabic poetry was an authentic product of its environment, rather than a fabrication of later periods.

Al-Asad also took a particular interest in studying the literary life of the Levant (Jordan and Palestine) during the modern era. His book Modern Literary Trends in Palestine and Jordan (1957) is considered a pioneering work in its field, being the first historical-critical study to document the development of modern literature in Palestine and Jordan from the late Ottoman period to the mid-20th century. In it, he examined the poetic and prose movements, literary journalism, and leading literary figures in both countries, highlighting the cultural interactions between them and the influence of political events (such as the Nakba) on literary output. He also published Modern Poetry in Palestine and Jordan (1961), a collection of his lectures discussing the works of major modern poets in Palestine and Jordan during the first half of the 20th century. Through these two works, he introduced Palestinian and Jordanian literature into the Arab academic sphere, establishing critical foundations for its study independent of Westernization or distortion.

In addition, al-Asad devoted efforts to studying various social and cultural phenomena in the classical Arab heritage. His book Slave Girls and Singing in the Pre-Islamic Era (published 1968) analyzed the role of singing women and the art of music in pre-Islamic society from both historical and literary perspectives. In this study, he traced accounts of female singers and the poets associated with them, concluding that musical art was an integral, authentic part of ancient Arab life rather than a later intrusion. He also took an interest in prominent intellectual figures of the Arab Renaissance at the turn of the 20th century, producing a study on the writer and politician Muhammad Ruhi al-Khalidi, highlighting his contributions. Moreover, he wrote about Khalil Beidas, presenting him as a pioneer of the short story genre in Palestine and recognizing his contributions to establishing the art of Arabic storytelling at the start of the 20th century.

Another important dimension of al-Asad’s thought was his interest in education and culture from an Islamic civilizational perspective. In his book Islamic Visions in University Education and Scientific Research, he proposed a vision for harmonizing Islamic values with modern scientific development in higher education, advocating a balanced approach that integrates authenticity with modernity. He emphasized the need to reconcile Arabism and Islam as two intertwined components of national identity, criticizing efforts to create an artificial rupture between them. In several of his essays, he addressed the topic of dialogue with the West. One of his most notable works in this field is the book Us and the Other: Conflict and Dialogue, where he discussed cultural interaction and civilizational clashes between Arabs and the West, calling for a dialogue based on equality and mutual understanding.

In general, Nasir al-Din al-Asad’s writings were characterized by eloquent, rigorous Arabic style that combined fluency with scholarly precision. He firmly believed in the central role of the Arabic language in shaping the intellectual and cultural identity of the nation, famously stating: “Language is the most important element of a nation’s personality.” He consistently defended the integrity of Arabic and advocated its use across all fields of science and knowledge, viewing its neglect as a threat to the nation’s identity. Al-Asad enriched the Arabic library with more than 60 books and studies in language, literature, and history, in addition to editing important heritage texts (such as The History of Najd and the Diwan of Qays ibn al-Khatim), and contributing to translations of significant historical works into Arabic, most notably The Awakening of the Arab Nation by George Antonius, which he co-translated with Ihsan Abbas.

=== His Critique of Taha Hussein ===
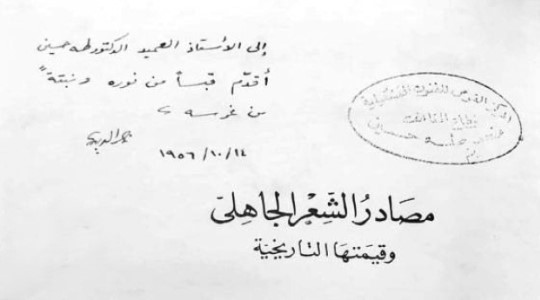
Nasir al-Din al-Asad writing a dedication to his teacher Taha Hussein

The intellectual relationship between Nasir al-Din al-Asad and his mentor Dr. Taha Hussein represents an important chapter in the academic journeys of both men, especially regarding the issue of pre-Islamic poetry. Al-Asad greatly revered Taha Hussein’s scholarly stature, describing him as encyclopedic and profoundly influential in literature and thought, yet he disagreed with him on certain conclusions concerning pre-Islamic poetry.

The story began when Taha Hussein published his famous 1926 book On Pre-Islamic Poetry, which provoked a storm of controversy due to his skepticism about the authenticity of much of the poetry attributed to pre-Islamic poets. Nearly thirty years later, in 1955, al-Asad presented his doctoral dissertation, Sources of Pre-Islamic Poetry and Their Historical Value, in which he addressed the same subject from a different perspective: he compiled diverse sources of pre-Islamic poetry, analyzed them historically, and concluded that a significant portion of the poetry was indeed authentic. He scientifically objected to the absolute skepticism adopted by Taha Hussein. Although al-Asad never explicitly stated that his dissertation was a direct rebuttal of Taha Hussein, scholarly circles considered it a calm and methodical refutation of his mentor’s hypotheses.

When al-Asad’s dissertation was defended at the Faculty of Arts (Cairo University), Taha Hussein was abroad on leave. It is said that upon his return and after reviewing the dissertation’s contents, Taha Hussein was angered, viewing it as a challenge to his views. He reportedly visited al-Asad’s office, ignoring formalities, and unleashed his anger and harsh criticism. Al-Asad listened respectfully without responding, mindful of his teacher’s stature and concerned about being perceived as insubordinate within the academic community. Shortly thereafter, Taha Hussein’s anger subsided. He revisited al-Asad, this time shaking his hand, praising his scholarly efforts, and acknowledging the soundness of his method and literary style.

Al-Asad later recalled visiting Taha Hussein in 1973 during his final days, finding him alone in his home after many former admirers had abandoned him. This scene was a poignant testament to the enduring personal bond that had survived their scholarly disputes and intellectual differences. Al-Asad thus exemplified the moderate, balanced, and objective method he consistently advocated: avoiding excessive veneration that blinds critical thinking, while maintaining literary decorum and ethical dialogue. His critique of Taha Hussein was characterized by being scholarly and methodological, rather than personal, aiming to reach the truth and to serve Arabic literature. Through this approach, al-Asad’s study became a foundational reference alongside that of his mentor, thereby enriching the critical project on pre-Islamic poetry from multiple perspectives.

== Works ==
Nasir al-Din al-Asad is regarded as one of the leading modern Arab scholars who adhered rigorously to scientific methodology with remarkable discipline and determination—qualities that may explain the relatively limited quantity of his output. Below is a list of his major works, arranged chronologically by year of publication:

Year	Title (Arabic) – English Translation	Description
1956	مصادر الشعر الجاهلي وقيمتها التاريخية – Sources of Pre-Islamic Poetry and Their Historical Value	An academic study examining the sources of pre-Islamic poetry and their historical reliability.
1957	الاتجاهات الأدبية الحديثة في فلسطين والأردن – Modern Literary Trends in Palestine and Jordan	A historical and critical study tracing the development of the modern literary movement in Palestine and Jordan in the early 20th century.
1961	الشعر الحديث في فلسطين والأردن – Modern Poetry in Palestine and Jordan	A collection of lectures and studies on major modern poets in Palestine and Jordan during the first half of the 20th century.
1968	القيان والغناء في العصر الجاهلي – Slave Girls and Singing in the Pre-Islamic Era	A historical and literary study on the role of female singers and the musical arts in pre-Islamic Arab society.
1969	خليل بيدس رائد القصة الحديثة في فلسطين – Khalil Beidas: Pioneer of the Modern Short Story in Palestine	A study on the writer Khalil Beidas and his contribution to the founding of the modern Arabic short story in Palestine.
1980	محمد روحي الخالدي – Muhammad Ruhi al-Khalidi	A study presenting the life and works of Muhammad Ruhi al-Khalidi as one of the pioneers of intellectual and literary life in early 20th-century Palestine.
1992	تصورات إسلامية في التعليم الجامعي والبحث العلمي – Islamic Visions in University Education and Scientific Research	A book proposing visions and ideas for the development of higher education and scientific research from a contemporary Islamic perspective.
1997	نحن والآخر: صراع وحوار – Us and the Other: Conflict and Dialogue	Essays analyzing the relationship between Arab-Islamic civilization and the West, advocating for dialogue and understanding instead of conflict.
1999	نشأة الشعر الجاهلي وتطوره (دراسة في المنهج) محاولة أولى – The Emergence and Development of Pre-Islamic Poetry (A Methodological Study): First Attempt	A critical and methodological study analyzing the emergence and development of pre-Islamic poetry through textual analysis and historical context.
2012	تحقيقات في اللغة والأدب – Investigations in Language and Literature	A comprehensive collection reflecting al-Asad’s deep passion for Arabic philology, combining rigorous scholarship and a dedication to language and literature.

In addition to the above, al-Asad published dozens of other studies and articles in peer-reviewed journals and cultural magazines, in addition to editing important classical texts and translating several historical and intellectual works into Arabic. The total number of his publications exceeded 64 titles in literature, linguistics, and history, according to some sources.

=== Other published works ===
He has authored contributed to at least 38 different publications.

- "Muʿǧam ǧawāhir al-ašʿār wa-l-taḥqīqāt al-adabiyyaẗ" (2013) of Ṣāliḥ Ǧaybāt with Nāṣir al-Dīn al- Asad (1923-2015) (Author of introduction)
- "Dīwān" (1991) of Qays ibn Adī Abū Yazīd Ibn al H̱aṭīm with Nāṣir al-Dīn al- Asad (1923-2015) as Editor
- Al-Qiyān wa al-ġināʾ fī al-ʿaṣr al-ǧhilī (1988)
- Maṣādir al-šiʿr al-ǧāhilī wa-qīmaẗuhā al-tārīẖiyyaẗ (1962)

== Awards ==
Throughout his career, Nasir al-Din al-Asad received numerous honors and awards in recognition of his intellectual and literary contributions. The most notable among them include:

- 1947: Taha Hussein Prize: An Egyptian honorary award he received early in his career after graduating from Cairo University. The prize bears the name of his mentor, Dr. Taha Hussein, and honors excellence in literary studies. This prize served as a significant moral boost for al-Asad at the beginning of his academic journey.
- 1982: King Faisal International Prize for Arabic Literature: One of the most prestigious global awards in Arabic literature, awarded to him for his distinguished contributions to the study of classical Arabic literature, particularly for his book Sources of Pre-Islamic Poetry and Their Historical Value, which was praised for its originality, objectivity, and scientific rigor in addressing issues of pre-Islamic poetry. The awarding committee noted that his studies fulfilled one of the main objectives of the prize by academically addressing doubts surrounding ancient poetic heritage.
- 1995: Sultan Bin Ali Al Owais Cultural Award: A prestigious award from the United Arab Emirates granted to distinguished Arab creators in the fields of literature and thought. Al-Asad received the award for his overall achievements in literary and critical studies, affirming his status as one of the major modern Arab literary critics and writers.
- 2003: Jordanian State Appreciation Award in Literature: The highest literary honor in the Hashemite Kingdom of Jordan, awarded to him in recognition of his long-standing service to Jordanian and Arab literature and culture. Through this award, al-Asad represented his country among the leading intellectuals honored at the national level.
- 2011: Naguib Mahfouz Award for an Arab Writer: An award presented by the Egyptian Writers’ Union bearing the name of the world-renowned author Naguib Mahfouz, recognizing senior Arab writers for their life's work. Al-Asad received this award in a ceremony in Cairo, during which he delivered a short speech expressing his pride, stating: “Today I stand crowned by the Taha Hussein Prize at the beginning, and the Naguib Mahfouz Prize at the end. What crown is more precious than mine!”

=== Decorations ===
In addition to his awards, Nasir al-Din al-Asad received several honors and decorations:

- : Jordanian Order of Independence, First Class
- : Order of the Renaissance (Jordan)
- : Silver Jubilee Certificate

He was also honored by several academic institutions through honorary memberships and commemorative celebrations of his achievements. Al-Asad was often invited as a guest of honor at many Arab literary conferences and festivals.

== Death ==
Nasir al-Din al-Asad died in Amman on May 21, 2015, at the age of 93, after a brief illness. He died at Amman Surgical Hospital, where he had been receiving treatment. Jordan mourned his death both officially and popularly, and his funeral prayer was held following the Friday afternoon prayer at the University of Jordan Mosque before he was laid to rest in the family cemetery. A large crowd of government officials, intellectuals, students, and admirers attended the funeral, providing a farewell fitting for a major scientific and intellectual figure who served his nation and his Arab identity. The Arab Writers and Authors Union issued a statement mourning his loss, describing it as a profound loss for Arab thought and culture. Al-Asad left behind a rich scholarly legacy and hundreds of studies and articles, many of which were not yet compiled into books; it is reported that his family preserves several unpublished manuscripts. He also left a deep impact on the hearts of his students and colleagues, who remembered him for his composure, objectivity, and academic integrity. The University of Jordan, of which he was a founder and its first president, honored him by naming one of its library halls after him and displaying some of his personal library holdings that he had donated shortly before his death.
