= Fawzi Gharaibeh =

Jordanian academic (born 1943)

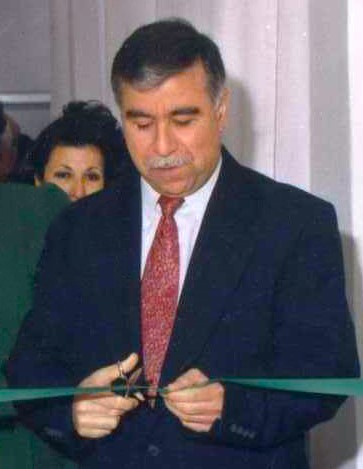
- Fawzi Gharaibeh at the University of Jordan, March 25, 1995.
- Born: 1943 (age 82–83); Huwwarah, Irbid
- Education: Cairo University (Major: Commerce) (Degree: Bachelor’s) (1961–); Texas Tech University (Major: Business Administration) (Degree: Master's) (1966–1968); University of Wisconsin–Madison (Major: Business Administration) (Degree: PhD) (1969–1972)
- Occupations: academic, political, educational, and economic personality
- Employers: University of Jordan; Portland State University; University of Texas at Austin

Fawzi AbdulRahim Ahmad al-Gharaibeh (Arabic: فوزي الغرايبة; born 1943 in Huwwarah, Irbid – ) is a Jordanian academic and public official. He served as president of the University of Jordan (1991–1998) and as minister of education (1998–1999). He also founded and chaired Al-Sharqiyah University in Oman from 2009 to 2014, and contributed to establishing the University of Petra.

Gharaibeh earned a PhD in the 1970s. He holds an MBA; sources note study at the University of Wisconsin and Texas Tech University. He completed a bachelor's degree with honors from Cairo University in 1965.

Also, he is a member of the Royal Scientific Society and the UNESCO Executive Board. He has also served on the International Criminal Court's Budget and Finance Committee in The Hague and on the Executive Council of the International Association of Universities.

== Personal life ==
Fawzi al-Gharaibeh was born in 1943 in Huwwarah, Irbid, Jordan. He is the eldest of seven sisters and one brother. His father, Abd al-Rahim al-Gharaibeh, worked in trade and with his brother helped to establish one of Irbid's first industrial carpentry workshops in the early 1940s, importing machinery from Haifa.

Al-Gharaibeh completed his schooling at Hamza bin Abdul Muttalib School and Irbid Secondary School. He earned a Bacheloro of Commerce with honors from Cairo University in 1965, an MBA from Texas Tech University, and a Doctorate in Business Administration from the University of Wisconsin in 1972.

During his time at the University of Jordan, al-Gharaibeh married one of his student. They have three children: two daughters and a son, Ahmed. He speaks Arabic, English, and French. He has said he does not identify as a liberal and instead describes his outlook as flexible and open to revision rather than tied to a fixed ideology.

== Life and career ==
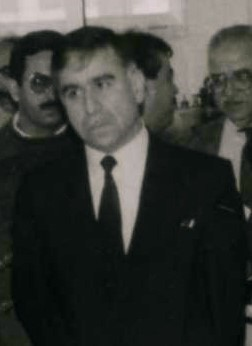
Fawzi al-Gharaibeh, as the president of the University of Jordan, May 10, 1992.

Al-Gharaibeh's career combined academic and administrative roles at the University of Jordan. He began as an assistant professor, and served as department chair and assistant dean, and later became university president. He was promoted to full professor in 1981. He later served as dean of the Faculty of Economics and Administrative Sciences, then as vice president for administrative affairs, before his appointment as president.

In addition to his university roles, al-Gharaibeh served as Jordan's minister of education (1998–1999). He has published in Arabic and English and held visiting appointments at universities in the United States.

=== Positions ===
Throughout his career, Gharaibeh held posts in academia and government, such as Dean of the Faculty of Economics and Administrative Sciences at the University of Jordan (1983–1986); Chairman of the Foreign Diploma Equivalency Committee (1986–1991); Vice President of the University of Jordan (1986–1990); Chairman of the Higher Education Council (1991–1993); President of the Jordanian Association of Graduates of American Universities and Institutes (1991–1994); President of the University of Jordan (1991–1998); Vice President of the Higher Education Council (1995–1998); Minister of Education (1998–1999); Chairman of the Board of Directors of the Jordanian Phosphate Mines Company (1999–2000); founder and President of Al-Sharqiyah University in Oman (2009–2014); and Chairman of the Board of Trustees of the Jordan University of Science and Technology (2012–2013).

=== Memberships ===
- 1985 - 1992: Advisory Committee, College of Management and Economics, Qatar University.
- 1989 - 1990: National Committee for Drafting the National Charter, Jordan.
- 1989 - 1991: Board of Directors, University of Petra, Jordan.
- 1991 - 2009: American Accounting Association Membership, USA.
- 1991 - 1994: Economic Advisory Council, Jordanian Government.
- 1991 - 2004: Higher Education Council Membership, Jordan.
- 1991 - 2009: Jordanian-American Committee for Cultural Exchange (Fulbright Commission) Membership.
- 1994 - 1998: Executive Council, International Association of Universities, Paris, France.
- 1995 - 1998: Jordan Institute of Diplomacy Membership, Jordan.
- 2001 - 2005: Executive Board, UNESCO, Paris, France.
- 2001 - 2009: Council of the Center for Strategic Studies, University of Jordan Membership.
- 2003–Present: Budget and Finance Committee, International Criminal Court, The Hague, Netherlands.
- 2003–Present: Board of Trustees, King Hussein Foundation, Jordan.
- 2003 - 2006: Supreme Committee for the Accounting Profession Membership.
- 2003 - 2006: Board of Trustees, University of Science and Technology, Jordan.
- 2003–Present: Royal Scientific Society Membership.
- 2006 - 2009: Advisory Board, Graduate School of Business Administration, German Jordanian University, Jordan.
- 2006 - 2009: Board of Trustees, Al-Balqaʼ Applied University, Jordan.
