= Wajih Owais =

Jordanian molecular biologist and politician

Wajih Mousa Owais

Minister of Higher Education and Scientific Research
- In office 9 February 2011 – 17 November 2011
- In office 1 June 2016 – 28 September 2016
- Succeeded by: Adel Tweisi
- In office 11 October 2021 – 26 October 2022
- Succeeded by: Azmi Mahafzah

Personal details
- Born: November 5, 1947 (age 78) Ajloun, Jordan
- Education: Washington State University (PhD)
- Profession: Minister (government)

Wajih Mousa Owais (Arabic: وجيه موسى عويس) (born November 5, 1947) is a Jordanian politician and former Minister of Higher Education and Scientific Research.

== Career ==
He was appointed as Minister in February 2011. Owais was the Professor of Genetics, a researcher, chairman of Board of Directors of King Abdullah University Hospital, and the President of Jordan University of Science and Technology from September, 2003 to February, 2011. In 1972, he got his B.Sc. in the field of biology from the American University of Beirut. In 1975, he got his M.Sc. in the field of biochemistry from the University of Jordan. In 1979, he obtained his Ph.D. in the field of molecular genetics from Washington State University.

Between 1 June and 28 September 2016 Owais served as Minister of Higher education and scientific research in Hani Al-Mulki's cabinet. He was replaced in a cabinet reshuffle by Adel Tweisi. Owais was subsequently appointed to the Senate.

Between 11 October 2021 and 26 October 2022 he served again as minister of higher education and scientific research.

== Awards ==
Owais was awarded the "Commemorative Medal" by Czech University of Agriculture Prague, a "Sculpture of Honor" by Czech University of Agriculture Prague in May, 2005, and an honorary degree "Doctor of Science" from New York Institute of Technology in 2005. Owais supervised 45 graduate students (M.Sc.) who all have graduated and he has published more than 34 research papers.
