= Azmi Mahafzah =

Jordanian politician

His Excellency Azmi Mahafzah
- عزمي محافظة
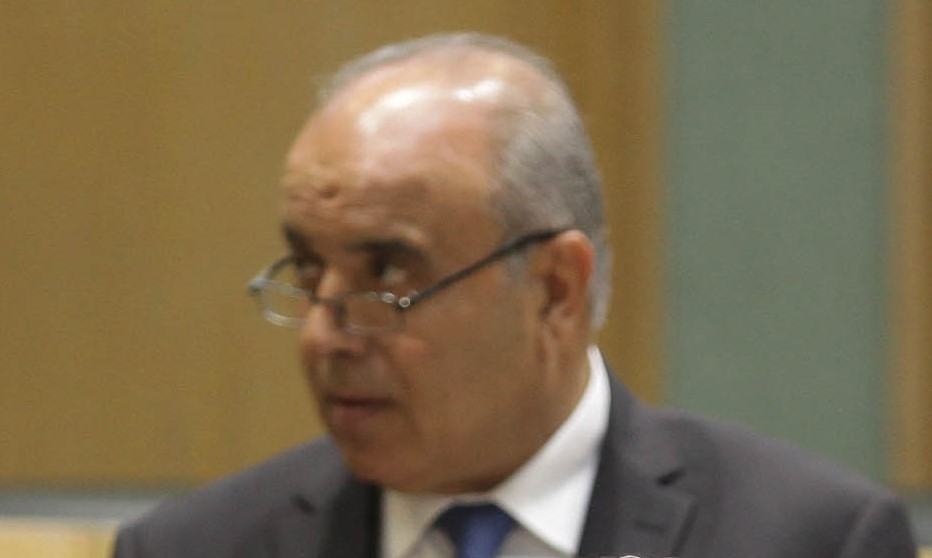
- Mahafzah in 2018

Minister of Education and Minister of Higher Education and Scientific Research
- Incumbent
- Assumed office 27 October 2022
- Monarch: Abdullah II of Jordan
- Prime Minister: Bisher Al-Khasawneh
- Preceded by: Wajih Owais

13 President of the University of Jordan
- In office April 16, 2016 – June 14, 2018
- Preceded by: Ekhleif al-Tarawneh
- Succeeded by: Abdel-Karim Al-Qudah

Personal details
- Education: University of Damascus (MD); American University of Beirut (PhD)

Azmi Mahafzah is the Jordanian Minister of Education and Minister of Higher Education and Scientific Research. He was appointed as minister on 27 October 2022.

== Education ==
Mahafzah holds a Doctor of Medicine (1977) from the University of Damascus and a Doctor of Philosophy in Microbiology and Immunology (1984) from the American University of Beirut.

== Career ==
Since 1984, Mahafzah has worked as a lecturer and since 2009 as professor at the University of Jordan. Additionally, he held several positions at Jordan University Hospital from 1989 until 2013. From 2010 until 2013, he served as Dean of the Faculty of Medicine.

In 2013, Mahafzah was appointed Vice President for Scientific Faculties and in 2016, he became President of the University of Jordan.

In June 2018, he was appointed Minister of Education and additionally, he became Minister of Higher Education and Scientific Research in October.

In November 2018, he resigned as minister.

Since 27 October 2022, he has been Minister of Education and Minister of Higher Education and Scientific Research.
