= Ishaq Al-Farhan =

Jordanian politician (1934–2018)

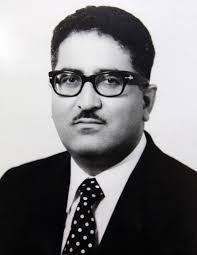
Ishaq Farhan Portrait.

Ishaq Ahmad Farhan, born in Ein Kerem, Palestine (1934 – 6 July 2018) was a Jordanian politician and educator of Palestinian origin. He studied chemistry at the American University of Beirut then went on to pursue a Ph.D. in the Education of Science from Columbia University. He spoke Arabic and English. Moreover, Ishaq was a politician, thinker, teacher, and educator, which made him one of the leaders of the Islamic Action Front. Ishaq was a key figure of the Jordanian advisory council and a believer in the direction of Wasfi Al-Tal and entered the government of Wasfi Al-Tal in 1970 then broke away from the Islamic movement while holding the position of Minister of Education and Islamic Endowments in 1973. There, he supervised the formulation of educational curricula for the government of Ahmed Al-Lozi. Additionally, he was the President of the Royal Scientific Society and the University of Jordan. He strongly came back to manage the Islamic movement, receiving the secretariat of the Islamic Action Front. Moreover, he was a member of the Jordanian House of Senates from 1989-1993, and became head of the Zarqa Private University in 1994 till 2007. He also received several medals of honor. Furthermore, his meeting on Al Jazeera's "Bala Hadood" (Without Borders) television program showed the effect of changing curriculum on the identity in mother tongue education. He also showed the Nakba memory and lack of empathy with the Israeli-Palestinian conflict.
