= Thouqan Hindawi =

Jordanian politician

His Excellency Thuqan Hindawi ذوقان الهنداوي
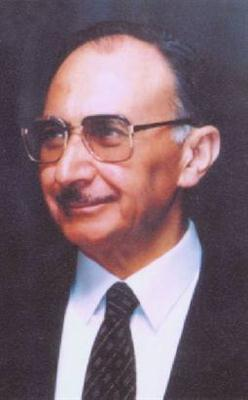
- Monarch: King Hussein

Minister of Education & Deputy Prime Minister . Senator in Upper & Lower Houses of Parliament . Chief of Staff Royal Hashemite Court . Diplomat & Ambassador

Personal details
- Born: Thuqan Hindawi ذوقان الهنداوي; 23 June 1927 Irbid, Jordan
- Died: 2 July 2005 (aged 78) Amman, Jordan
- Parent: Salem Pasha Hindawi (Father) سالم باشا الهنداوي

Thuqan Hindawi (Arabic: ذوقان الهنداوي) was a Jordanian politician and educator. Over a public career spanning four decades, he held a number of senior government positions, including Chief of the Royal Hashemite Court, Deputy Prime Minister, and several ministerial portfolios. He also served as a legislator in both houses of parliament and as a Jordanian ambassador. Hindawi was buried in the Royal Hashemite Court Cemetery near the tomb of King Hussein of Jordan.

== Education ==
Hindawi started his early schooling years in the Northern Region of Jordan, until at a later stage he was selected to join the Arab College in Jerusalem in 1943 as well as the University of London in 1945 which made him earn his Palestinian Secondary School Certificate by 1946. After that he earned his Bachelor's Degree in History from Cairo University which was King Farouk I University at that time in 1950 and few years later he earned his Master's degree in Advanced Education from the University of Maryland in 1956.

== Occupation ==
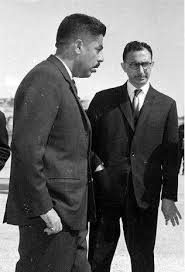
The First Ministerial Position Of His Excellency Thouqan Hindawi As Minister Of Media With Prime Minister Wasfi al-Tal On 13 February 1965

After earning his Bachelor's Degree, Hindawi started his career in the Public Sector in 1950 as a History Teacher in the Ministry of Education in Jordan. Soon after that he was promoted to become an Education Inspector and shortly after that the Director of the Teacher's Training Academy of Beit Hanina in the West Bank of Jordan. He moved in 1962 to become the Director of Social Affairs at the UNRWA United Nations Relief and Works Agency. He remained there couple of years until he was appointed as Educational Attaché in the Jordanian Embassy in Cairo in 1964 and then back to Jordan as the General Secretary of the Ministry of Media at that same year.

Hindawi held his 1st Ministerial Position with Prime Minister Wasfi al-Tal on 13 February 1965 as the Minister of Media. After that he held 20 more key Ministerial Cabinet Positions from 1965 until 1995 including Deputy Prime Minister, Minister of Education, Minister of Finance, Minister of Media, Minister of Social Affairs, Minister of Labor, Minister of State for Prime Ministry Affairs. Hindawi held the position of Minister of Education in Jordan more frequently and for a longer duration than any other individual. He is widely recognized by educators and historians for his role in shaping major educational developments in modern Jordan and contributing to broader regional education initiatives.

Hindawi was trusted by the late King Hussein of Jordan and was chosen to hold the important position of Chief of The Royal Hashemite Court in 1989. He was also appointed 2 times as an Ambassador for Jordan abroad and 4 times as a Senator in the Upper House of Parliament. He was elected by Jordanians in General Elections as a Deputy for the Eleventh Lower House of Parliament for a 4-year term.

Most of his life, Hindawi was on the Board of Trustees of a number of public and private academic institutions including the University of Jordan and the Yarmouk University as well as the chairman of the Board of Trustees of the Applied Science University and the Arab Community College. He received several prestigious State Medals and International Awards from a variety of countries and organizations. He wrote and published the Palestinian Case book which was consistently taught as a pillar of the Jordanian Secondary Curriculum from 1967 until 1994. It was announced that he also wrote his own autobiography which focused on his early days but it was not published until date.

Hindawi remained publicly active in government positions until he suddenly died from a severe heart attack on 2 July 2005 and was buried in The Royal Cemetery inside The Royal Hashemite Court near the late King Hussein of Jordan tomb.

== Gallery ==
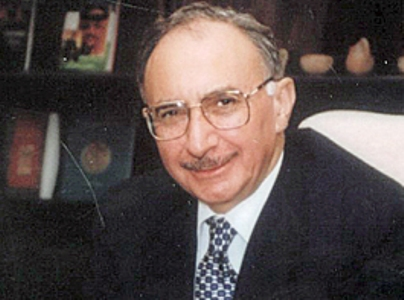
Hindawi as Deputy Prime Minister and Minister of Education at his office in the Jordanian Prime Ministry on 5 December 1994

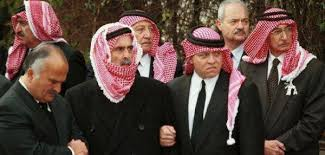
Hindawi At King Hussein's funeral on 8 February 1999

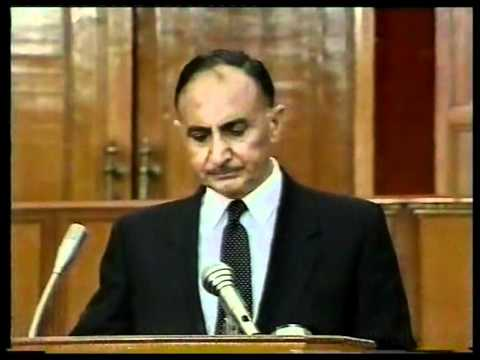
Elected in 1989 as Deputy in the 11th Jordanian Lower House Of Parliament

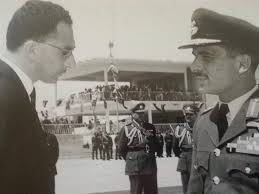
Hindawi with the King, 1967

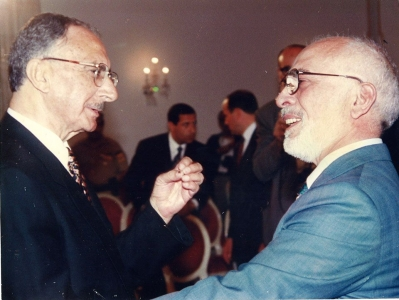
Hindawi with King Hussein

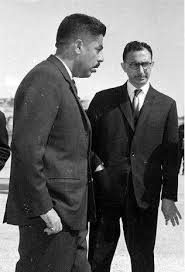
Thuqan Hindawi with Prime Minister Wassfi Al Tall in Marka Airport Summer 1965

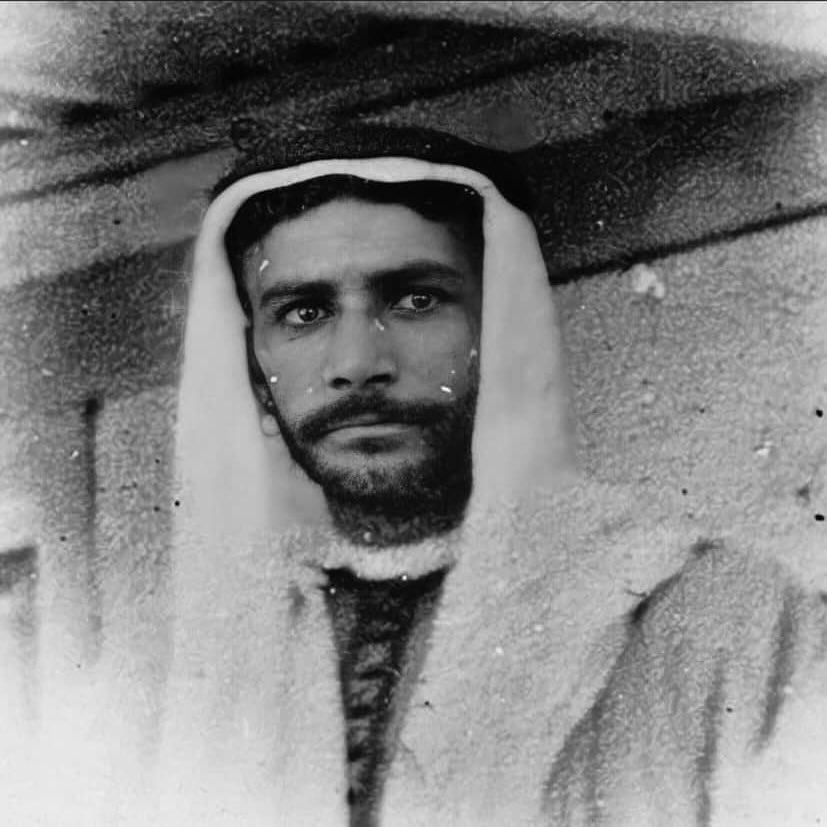
Thuqan Father - Sheikh Salem Pasha Hindawi
