= Royal Scientific Society =

Independent, not-for-profit multidisciplinary science institution

The Royal Scientific Society
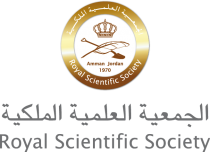
- Type: Nongovernmental
- Industry: Science
- Founded: 1970
- Founder: Prince El Hassan bin Talal
- Headquarters: Al-Jubaiha, Amman, Jordan
- Key people: Prince El Hassan bin Talal, Chairman; Princess Sumaya bint El Hassan, President
- Revenue: Not For profit
- Number of employees: 500+ (2024)
- Website: http://www.rss.jo

The Royal Scientific Society (RSS) in Jordan is an independent non-governmental, not-for-profit multidisciplinary science institution established by royal charter. Founded in 1970 as a national organisation to actively advise and support the development of Jordan with sound technical and policy advice, and consultations. The RSS undertakes specialised and accredited testing, research work with local industries and universities, consultations for the private and public sectors, and works in partnership with regional and international organisations. Since its inception, the prime objectives of the RSS have been to protect human health and safety, to safeguard the environment, and to contribute to sustainable economic development.

The RSS is the largest applied research institution in Jordan and a member of the International Science Council. In 2024 it had 500 staff.

== Main aims ==
- To support the development process in Jordan through R&D to strengthen the role of SMEs in Jordan's economy.
- To promote itself as a reference technical institution in Jordan and the region.
- To expand its role as a certification body for both skilled manpower and industrial products.
- To strengthen co-operation with similar institutions to promote mutual interests.
- To develop human resources.
- To encourage and support the start-up, incubation and development of innovation-led knowledge-based businesses.

== Technical centres ==
- Building Research Centre
- Electronic Services & Training Centre
- Environmental Research Centre
- Information Technology Centre
- Mechanical Design & Technology Centre
- Industrial Chemistry Centre
- Quality Assurance Department

There are also three supporting departments: Administrative, Financial, and Marketing and Public Relations.

== See also ==
- Ministry of Higher Education and Scientific Research (Jordan)
- University of Jordan
- Princess Sumaya University for Technology
- Jordan University of Science and Technology
