= Ministry of Higher Education and Scientific Research (Jordan) =

Government ministry of Jordan

Hashemite Kingdom of Jordan Ministry of Higher Education and Scientific Research وزارة التعليم العالي والبحث العلمي
- Emblem of Jordan

Agency overview
- Formed: 1982
- Jurisdiction: Government of Jordan
- Headquarters: Jubaiha, Amman (Jordan)
- Agency executive: Azmi Mahafzah
- Website: http://www.mohe.gov.jo/

The Ministry of Higher Education and Scientific Research (Arabic: وزارة التعليم العالي والبحث العلمي) is the government ministry that is responsible for maintaining and implementing government policies in higher education in Jordan. The ministry provides the support, services and organization aimed at guiding higher education sector in Jordan. The current minister is Azmi Mahafzah.

== History ==
The Council of Higher Education was established in 1982 in response to the increased demand of regulating and planning the policies of higher education. In 1985, the council was renamed to the Ministry of Higher Education.

The ministry was annulled and was merged within the Ministry of Education in 1998, but was re-established in 2001 and was renamed as the Ministry of Higher Education and Scientific Research.

== Scientific Research ==
The ministry following its re-establishment in 2001, was given a new responsibility of guiding the scientific research sector of higher education in Jordan. In 2005, the Scientific Research Committee was formed. Since 2006, the ministry issues several internationally peer-reviewed journals in cooperation with several Jordanian universities:

1. Jordan Journal of Mechanical and Industrial Engineering (JJMIE) published in cooperation with the Deanship of Graduate Studies and Scientific Research in the Hashemite University.
2. Jordan Journal of Biological Sciences The Journal is published in cooperation with the Hashemite University. ISSN 1995-6673
3. Jordan Journal of Chemistry (JJC). Published in cooperation with the Deanship of Research and Graduate Studies in Yarmouk University. (ISSN 1814-9111)
4. Jordan Journal of Civil Engineering (JJCE). Published in cooperation with Jordan University of Science and Technology.
5. Jordan Journal of Earth and Environmental Sciences (JJEES). Published in cooperation with the Hashemite University.
6. Jordan Journal of Physics (JJP) published with Yarmouk University. (ISSN 1994-7615)
7. Jordan Journal of Modern Languages and Literature published with Yarmouk University. (ISSN 1994-6953)
8. Jordan Journal of Educational Sciences (JJES) published in cooperation with Yarmouk University. (ISSN 1814-9480)
9. Jordan Journal of Arabic Language and Literatureالمجلة الأردنية في اللغة العربية وآدابها a journal in Arabic language published with Mu'tah University.
