= Amin Mahmoud (politician) =

Jordanian politician and educator (born 1940)

His Excellency Amin A. Mahmoud
- أمين عبد الله محمود
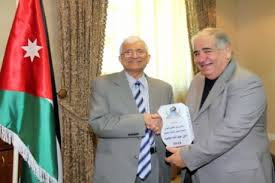

Minister of Culture
- In office 30 May 1993 – 20 August 1994
- Monarch: King Hussein
- Prime Minister: Abdelsalam al-Majali
- Preceded by: Mahmoud Al-Samra
- Succeeded by: Jumaa Hamaad
- In office 7 April 2005 – 27 November 2005
- Monarch: Abdullah II
- Prime Minister: Adnan Badran
- Preceded by: Asma Khader Hanna Salem
- Succeeded by: Adel Issa Tweissi

Senator in the XXIV Senate of Jordan
- In office 2010–2011
- Monarch: Abdullah II

Minister of Higher Education and Scientific Research
- In office 30 March 2013 – 2 March 2015
- Monarch: Abdullah II
- Prime Minister: Abdullah Ensour
- Preceded by: Wajih Owais
- Succeeded by: Labib Khadra

Senator in the XXVI Senate of Jordan
- In office 3 March 2015 – 6 March 2016
- Monarch: Abdullah II

Personal details
- Born: Amin Abdallah Mahmoud; 1940 (age 85–86) Bethlehem
- Party: Independent
- Children: 4
- Education: Georgetown University
- Profession: Professor of Modern History

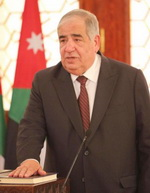
Swearing-In Government

Amin Mahmoud (Arabic: أمين عبد الله محمود) (born 1940) is a Jordanian politician, educator and author. He has served three times as a member of the cabinet of Ministers of Jordan (also notably served as Deputy Prime minister and Minister of Higher Education and Scientific Research), once as a member of the XXIV Senate of Jordan, and is currently serving as a member of the XXVI senate council. He has also held the position of president of four Jordanian universities. His written works include a wide range of books, research papers and published articles in the fields of history, education and other public issues.

== Early life and education ==
Amin Mahmoud was born in Bethlehem, West Bank, in 1940. His family was of modest means, but his father placed great value on education, making sure that young Amin attended Bethlehem High School despite a three kilometre walking commute each day. At the age of 18 he finished high school and left the West Bank to study history at the Ain Shams University in Cairo, Egypt, graduating with a Bachelor of Arts degree in 1962. On completion of his history degree, he taught briefly at Aroub, Jordan, then from 1963 to 1966 at the Rashidiya school in Jerusalem.

After winning a scholarship grant under the Fulbright Program Amin Mahmoud left the Middle East in 1966, to study in the United States at Georgetown University, Washington, D.C. where he was awarded a Master's degree in Modern history and International relations in 1968. A further grant was awarded to continue studies at the same university, this time for a doctorate, which he gained in Modern history in 1972.

During his time in the United States, the events of the Six-Day War in 1967 and the subsequent Palestinian Exodus had dramatically changed Amin Mahmoud's homeland, with the displacement of around 300,000 of his countrymen to Jordan, and it was to Jordan, not the West Bank, that he would return in 1972.

== Early career and teaching ==
Dr Mahmoud further developed his initial career in education while studying in the United States in the late 1960s, taking the position of research and teaching assistant at the Department of History, Georgetown University, Washington, D.C., in 1969 and continuing in that role until 1972 when he returned to the Middle East after receiving his doctorate. He then began a lengthy tenure as a teacher of history and political science at the University of Jordan, in Amman, from 1972 until 1984. During this time, he served as President of the Jordan University Club in 1977, with remit for the university's social and external events. Upon receiving his professorship in 1986 at the University of Kuwait, he remained there as Professor of History and Political Science until 1990. Throughout his later career as an educator, he has also worked as a visiting professor at several universities across the Arab region.

== University presidencies and other notable appointments ==
Dr Mahmoud has held several senior positions in academia, including the presidencies of four universities in Jordan. After more than a decade in teaching, he founded the Center for Hebrew Studies in 1984 in collaboration with Yarmouk University, Jordan – this was the country's first educational establishment to focus on Israeli affairs, and was uncommon at that time in the Arab region as a whole. He also served as director of the center from 1984 to 1986 before returning to Kuwait University to become a professor.

In 1990, he returned to a founding role in Jordan, establishing the Jordan University for Women where he spent the next three years as director until 1993. The university eventually became part of Petra University in Amman, as the Faculty of Arts and Sciences. He would return to Petra University ten years later, serving as president from 2003 to 2005. During that ten-year period, in addition to beginning his political career, he also held two other university presidencies; firstly at Al-Zaytoonah University of Jordan from 1994 to 1995, and then at Al-Ahliyya Amman University between 1995 and 2002.

Other notable appointments held by Dr Mahmoud include Secretary General of the Association of Arab Universities, President of the Board of Trustees of the German Jordanian University from 2009 to 2013 and chairman of the board of directors for the Abdul Hameed Shoman Foundation.

== Political career ==
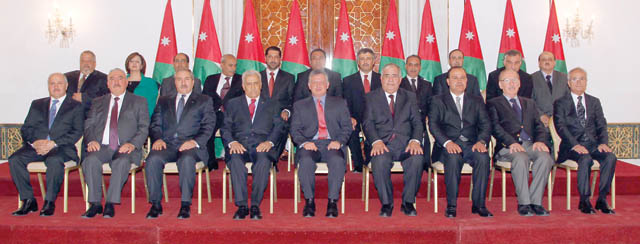
Cabinet with his Majesty King of Jordan King Abdullah II

Dr Mahmoud began his senior political career in 1993 with his appointment as Minister of Culture, serving under Prime Minister Abdelsalam al-Majali until 1994. After a period working in presidential roles at several universities, he returned to the Jordanian Cabinet in 2005, again as Minister of Culture, this time serving under Prime Minister Adnan Badran and he took up his third and current ministerial appointment, as Deputy Prime Minister and Minister of Higher Education and Scientific Research, under the current Prime Minister Abdullah Ensour.

In addition to his ministerial posts, he has also served as a member of the Jordanian Senate, elected by the King of Jordan and responsible for legislative functions and political oversight, and has previously served as acting Chair of the Foreign Affairs Committee.

Elected as a member in the Royal Committee to Modernise the Political System by his majesty the king in June 2021. Committee chaired by His Excellency Samir Rifai.

== Consultancy and advisory work ==
Dr Mahmoud has been employed as a consultant and adviser for many academic and governmental institutions, both in Jordan and overseas. He has previously performed the role of academic adviser for several Middle East universities and colleges, including the Ajman University of Science and Technology in the United Arab Emirates from 2000 to 2002, Al-Zahra College for Women in Oman from 2002 to 2005, and at the Aqaba University of Technology in Jordan between 2008 and 2010. In addition to these roles, between 2006 and 2007 he worked as an adviser for the Arab Academy for Banking and Financial Sciences and also was the Head of the Education Working Group for the Talal Abu-Ghazaleh Organization, – a global professional services provider headquartered in Amman.

== Authoring and publishing ==
Throughout his career, Dr Mahmoud has been an active author and publisher, with over 70 academic research papers and other articles to his credit in both Arabic and English, addressing a variety of public and educational matters. Many of these published works have been presented at local and international forums and workshops. He has also written and published several books, on topics such as the position and role of the Soviet Union in the creation of the State of Israel and on the history of Jewish settlement projects from the time of the French Revolution until the end of the First World War.

== Minister of Higher Education role ==
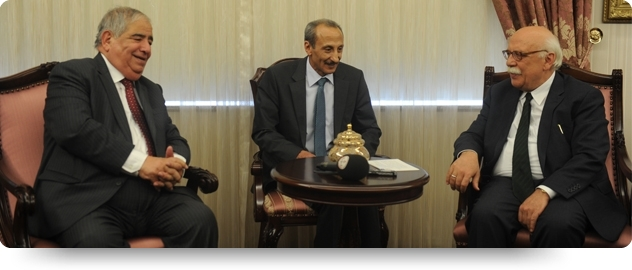
Amin Mahmoud meeting Turkish minister of Higher Education

Since taking up his current position as Deputy prime minister and Minister of Higher Education and Scientific Research in Jordan, Dr Mahmoud has been forging international relations with a number of countries (such as Oman, Qatar and Kuwait) focusing on bilateral cooperation on educational projects. In particular, with Turkey, China, Armenia and Saudi Arabia, he has held discussions about the potential founding of joint-venture universities, similar in nature to that of the German Jordanian University in Amman, Jordan. He has also shown support for pan-Arabian educational and scientific networks such as the Arab Innovation Network – founded at the University of Cambridge as a not-for-profit organisation for the encouragement of Arab students in entrepreneurship and problem-solving.

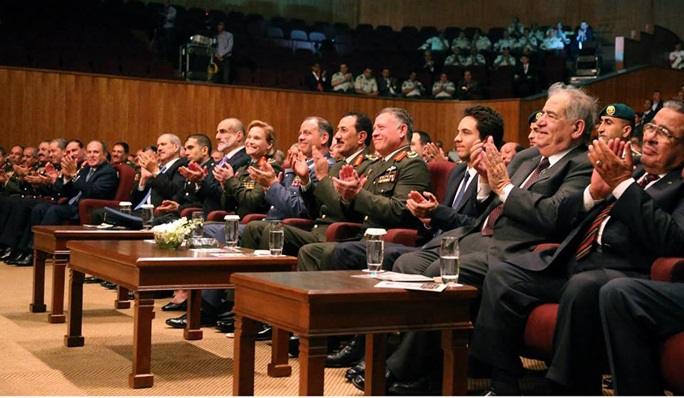
His Majesty attends a celebration marking the anniversary of the Great Arab Revolt and the Army day at the Martyrs' Monument 10/6/2014

In addition to fostering international relationships, Dr Mahmoud's remit extends to the interests of Jordanian overseas students: after political upheaval in Ukraine in early 2014, in order to address potential concerns for the welfare of Jordanian nationals studying in that country (who number in the thousands, and of whom approximately 250 reside in Crimea), Dr Mahmoud visited Ukraine in March of that year. During that trip, he met with Ukrainian Higher Education officials, to seek assurances about the safety of the students and to further assess the situation. As well as these humanitarian efforts, he has been actively promoting further opportunities for overseas studies, such as the creation of 50 medical scholarships in Egyptian universities for Jordanian students. As well as these humanitarian efforts, he has been actively promoting further opportunities for overseas studies, such as the creation of 50 medical scholarships in Egyptian universities for Jordanian students.

Minister for Higher Education and Scientific Research, Amin Mahmoud, was quoted saying, "The establishment of the university is in line with the ministry's efforts to bridge the gap between the educational system output in Jordan in its comprehensive concept with the knowledge economy requirements and align it with the job market." This came as an MOU was signed with China's University of Geosciences.

Dr. Mahmoud chaired multiple cabinet meetings as acting prime minister as well as attending Jordan's 68th independence day and other national celebrations on 10 June 2014 deputizing for prime minister Abdullah Ensour during his visit to Switzerland.

Deputy Prime Minister and Minister of Higher Education quit his cabinet post on 2 March 2015 with the latest Royal decree approving a cabinet reshuffle.

== Ukrainian unrest ==
Dr. Serhiy Pasko, the ambassador of Ukraine, met on 27 April 2014 with Dr. Mahmoud. They held talks about the latest developments in the south-eastern regions of Ukraine and about the security of Jordanian students who study there.

In recent developments the Ukrainian Ambassador to Jordan Sergi Basco said his country has proposed to Jordan to transfer around 3,500 Jordanian students from unstable regions in his country to safer and more secure areas towards the country's west and to the capital Kiev.

The Minister of Higher Education and Scientific Research, Dr. Amin Mahmoud "It's a result of the conditions experienced by Ukraine currently allows for Jordanian students studying at universities in eastern Ukraine transfer to universities recognized by the ministry and installed on the Ministry's website in the west of Ukraine, or to any of the states that formed the Union the former Soviet regardless of the time spent student at the University of graduation (and so for the academic year 2015/2014 only)."

== Current role and latest news ==
A royal decree was issued 3 March 2015 appointing Mahmoud as a member of the XXVI Senate of Jordan. Alongside his senate role Amin Mahmoud was appointed on 15 June 2015 as Senior adviser on Education to Abu-Ghazaleh.

Bahrain education minister receives Jordanian Senate member Amin Mahmoud, currently on a visit to the kingdom

== Selected works ==
- مشاريع الاستيطان اليهودي في مرحلة التكوين publisher:dar-ein.com.
- الاتحاد السوفيتي وتاسيس دولة اسرائيل- Role of the Soviet Union in the creation of the State of Israel, ISBN 978-977-322-305-2 publisher:dar-ein.com.
- ﻣﺸﺎرﻳﻊ اﻻﺳﺘﻴﻄﺎن اﻟﻴﻬﻮدي ﻣﻨﺬ ﻗﻴﺎم اﻟﺜﻮرة اﻟﻔﺮﻧﺴﻴﺔ ﺣﺘﻰ ﻧﻬﺎﻳﺔ اﳊﺮب اﻟﻌﺎﳌﻴﺔ اﻷوﻟﻰ (this book is part of the world of knowledge monthly cultural series of books published by the National Council for Culture, Arts and Literature in Kuwait).
- Paper and Study- Reforming Higher Education in the Arab Word, some fundamental Issues (in Arabic) with Prof. Amin Mahmoud, UNDP on human development report 2004, Beirut 20th till 23 February 2004.
- Paper and Study- The King Hussein's Fund for Excellence, prepared with Prof. Amin Mahmoud, submitted to the Governor of Central Bank of Jordan, Dr. Ziad Fariz, Amman, 1999.
- الجامعات الخاصة في البلدان العربية- Private universities and colleges. Research and discussions of intellectual seminar held by the Arab Thought Forum in collaboration with the university of the brothers and the Friedrich Ebert Foundation, Ifrane, Rabat

== Multimedia ==
Dr. Mahmoud hosted the forty-seventh session of the General Conference of the Association of Arab Universities

Video Title	Length	Published date
Interview 60 minutes Jordan TV – 6 June 2014	45min:51sec	7 June 2014
Amin Mahmoud is the first Arab minister to visit Egypt after the victory of Field Marshal Sisi as Egypt's president	02min:42sec	5 June 2014
وزير البحث العلمى الأردنى: لا حياة للدول العربية بدون مصر	00min:47sec	5 June 2014
Roya interview	51min:56sec	25 Feb 2014
النسور يستقبل وزير التربية والتعليم والتعليم العالي البحريني	00:45sec	3 Apr 2014
Video Footage of Middle East University (Jordan) Graduation Ceremony 2012–2013	13min:16sec	16 Sep 2013
2013 Video – Interview and University Lecture	70min:32sec	9 Jan 2014
A representative of His Majesty King Abdullah II hosted the Minister of Higher Education	03min:33sec	26 Mar 2014
Ukrainian Visit Interview	24min:44sec	8 Mar 2014
JordanTV about Ukrainian trip	01min:42sec	8 Mar 2014
Live Local Radio Interview	06min:01sec	8 Mar 2014
University Violence	03min:43sec	5 May 2013
Jordan TV Full Interview with Minister about Violence in Universities	49min:17sec	8 May 2013
Deputy PM	00min:56sec	20 Nov 2013
Opening Ceremony	04min:11sec	31 Oct 2013
Full Radio Live Interview	42min:54sec	6 May 2013
Senate education committee meets Minister of Higher Education and Scientific Research	05min:49sec	29 Dec 2013
P.M meets with university presidents and boards of trustees and the Board of Higher Education	04min:12sec	23 Jun 2013
وزير التعليم العالي والبحث العلمي يفتتح ملعب خالد بن الوليد فى جامعة مؤتة		

== See also ==
- Second cabinet of Abdullah Ensour
- Senate of Jordan

Political offices
Preceded by Mahmoud Al Samra	Minister of Culture; 1993–1994	Succeeded by Jumaa Hamaad
Preceded by Asma Khader Hanna Salem	Minister of Culture; 2005–2005	Succeeded by Adel Issa Tweissi
Preceded by	Senator in the XXIV Senate of Jordan; 2010–2011	Succeeded by
Preceded by Wajih Owais	Deputy Prime Minister & Minister of Higher Education and Scientific Research; 2013–2015	Succeeded by Labib Khadra
Preceded by Imad Fakhoury	Senator in the XXVI Senate of Jordan; 2015–2016	Succeeded by
