= Ministry of Finance (Jordan) =

Government ministry of Jordan

Jordan Ministry of Finance
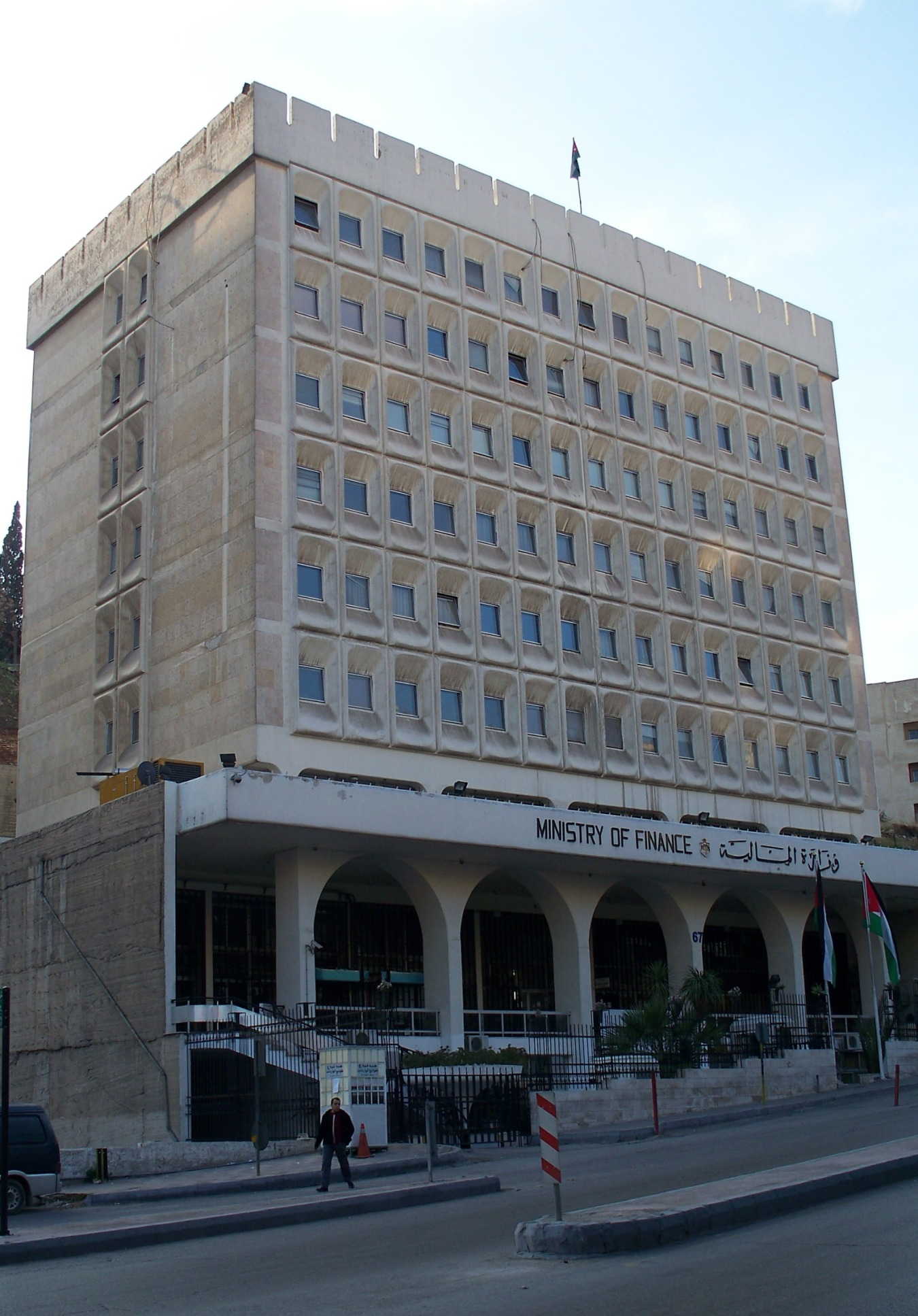

Department overview
- Formed: 1920
- Jurisdiction: Government of Jordan
- Headquarters: Amman
- Minister responsible: Mohamad Al Ississ, Minister of Finance
- Website: mof.gov.jo/en-us/mainpage.aspx

The Ministry of Finance (Arabic: وزارة المالية) is a Jordan government ministry responsible for public finances of the Hashemite Kingdom of Jordan in co-operation with the Central Bank of Jordan.

== Ministers of Finance ==
- Hasan Al-Hakim, 1921
- Madhar Raslan, 1921-1922
- Ahmed Hilmi Pasha, 1922-1924
- Hasan Abu Al-Huda, 1924-1926
- Alan Kirkbride, 1926-1928 (British)
- Ibrahim Hashem, 1928-1931
- Abd Allah Siraj, 1931-1933
- Shukri Shashaa, 1933-1938
- Abdullah Al-Hamoud, 1938-1939
- Abdullah Al-Hamoud, 1939-1940
- Nokola Ghanima, 1940-1941
- Nokola Ghanima, 1941-1942
- Shukri Shashaa, 1943
- Samir Al-Rifai, 1943-1944
- Moussallam Al-Attar, 1944-1945
- Sa'id Mufti, 1945
- Mohammad al-Shoreki, 1945-1946
- Nokola Ghanima, 1946-1947
- Suleiman Nabulsi, 1947
- Mohammad al-Shoreki, 1947
- Suleiman Al-Sukar, 1947-1949
- Suleiman Al-Sukar, 1949-1950
- Suleiman Nabulsi, 1950-1951
- Abdulrahman Khalifa, 1951
- Abdul Halim Al-Nimr, 1951-1952
- Musa Nasser, 1952-1953
- Suleiman Al-Sukar, 1953-1954
- Abdulrahman Khalifa, 1954
- Anastas Hanania, 1954-1955
- Bishara Ghosein, 1955
- Khulusi Al-Khairi, 1955-1956
- Hashem Al-Jayousi, 1956
- Bishara Ghosein, 1956
- Salah Toukan, 1956-1957
- Suleiman Al-Sukar, 1957
- Anastas Hanania, 1957-1958
- Ahmad Al-Tarawneh, 1958-1959
- Samaan Dawoud, 1959
- Hashem Al-Jayousi, 1959-1962
- Mohammad Ismail, 1962
- Izz al-Din Al-Mufti, 1962
- Hashem Al-Jayousi, 1962-1963
- Nizam al-Sharabi, 1963
- Abdullatif Anabtawi, 1963
- Nizam al-Sharabi, 1963-1964
- Hashem Al-Jayousi, 1964-1965
- Izz al-Din Al-Mufti, 1965-1966
- Said Al-Dajani, 1966-1967
- Abdulwahhab Al-Majali, 1967
- Hashem Al-Jayousi, 1967-1969
- Fadel Al-Dalqamuni, 1969
- Yaqub Muammar, 1969-1970
- Wasfi Anabtawi, 1970
- Abdul-Qadir Tash, 1970
- Fahd Jaradat, 1970
- Fawwaz Al-Rousan, 1970
- Ahmad Lozi, 1970
- Anis Mouasher, 1971-1972
- Fareed Al-Saad, 1972-1973
- Mohammad Shafik, 1973
- Dhuqan Al-Hindawi, 1973-1974
- Salem Massadeh, 1974-1976
- Mohammad Dabbas, 1976-1979
- Salem Massadeh, 1979-1984
- Hanna Odeh, 1984-1989
- Basil Jardaneh, 1989-1993
- Sami Qammuh, 1993-1995
- Basil Jardaneh, 1995-1996
- Marwan Awad, 1996-1997
- Suleiman Hafez, 1997-1998
- Michel Marto, 1998-2003
- Mohammad Abu Hammour, 2003-2005
- Bassem Awadallah, 2005
- Adel Al-Qudah, 2005-2006
- Ziad Fariz, 2006-2007
- Hamad Al-Kasasbeh, 2007-2009
- Bassem Al-Salem, 2009
- Mohammad Abu Hammour, 2009-2011
- Umayya Toukan, 2011-2012
- Suleiman Hafez, 2012-2013
- Umayya Toukan, 2013-2015
- Omar Malhas, 2015-2018
- Ezzedin Kanakrieh, 2018-2019
- Mohamad Al Ississ, 2019-

== See also ==
- Central Bank of Jordan
- Government of Jordan
- Economy of Jordan
- Finance ministry
- Jordanian dinar
