= Amin Mahmoud =

Amin Mahmoud may refer to:

- Amin El Hady (born 1983), Egyptian judoka
- Amin Mahmoud (politician) (born 1940), Jordanian politician, educator and author
