= ZCW =

ZCW may refer to:

- Al-Zahra College for Women, a private college in Muscat, Oman
- ZCW, the National Rail code for Canada Water station, London, England
