= Suleiman Hafez =

Jordanian economist and politician

Minister of Finance
- In office May 2012 – 30 March 2013
- Monarch: King Abdullah II
- Prime Minister: Fayez Tarawneh; Abdullah Ensour
- Preceded by: Umayya Toukan
- Succeeded by: Umayya Toukan

Personal details
- Born: 1941 (age 84–85)
- Education: Alexandria University

Suleiman Hafez, also known as Suleiman Hafez Al-Masri, (born 1941) is a Jordanian economist and politician who has served in various capacities in different cabinets of the Hashemite Kingdom of Jordan.

== Early life and education ==
Hafez was born in 1941. He holds a bachelor's degree in commerce from Beirut Arab University's branch of Alexandria University in Egypt in 1968.

== Career ==
Hafez served in different public positions, including chief commissioner of the electricity regulatory commission, and member of the board of directors of several organizations such as the royal Jordanian, the Jordan electricity authority, civil aviation authority, Jordan phosphate mines company, Jordan cement factories and the agricultural credit corporation. Then he held different cabinet posts; minister of finance from 1997 to 1998 and minister of telecommunications in 1999. He was the chairman of the Jordanian investment corporation from August 2000 to January 2003.

He was named as the minister of energy to the cabinet led by the then prime minister Samir Rifai in November 2010. He was appointed finance minister to the cabinet of the then prime minister Fayez Tarawneh in May 2012. He replaced Umayya Toukan as finance minister. Hafez retained his post in the cabinet formed by Abdullah Ensour on 11 October 2012. Hafez's term ended on 30 March 2013. He was replaced by Umayya Toukan in the post.
