= Mohammed Said Nabulsi =

Governor of the Central Bank of Jordan
- In office 1989–1995
- Preceded by: Hussein Al-Qasim
- Succeeded by: Ziad Fariz

Governor of the Central Bank of Jordan
- In office 1973–1985
- Preceded by: Khalil Al-Salem
- Succeeded by: Hussein Al-Qasim

Minister of National Economy
- In office 1972–1973
- Prime Minister: Ahmad al-Lawzi

Personal details
- Born: November 1928 Jaffa, Mandatory Palestine
- Died: 23 July 2013 (aged 84)

Mohammed Said Nabulsi (Arabic: محمد سعيد النابلسي; November 1928 – 23 July 2013) was a Jordanian banker, economist and politician. He served as Governor of the Central Bank of Jordan two times, first from 1973–1985, and secondly from 1989–1995.

== Career ==
Nabulsi was born in November 1928 in November 1928 in Jaffa, Mandatory Palestine. He studied law at Damascus University between 1948 and 1952 and received a Ph.D. in Economics from Georgetown University after studying there between 1954 and 1956 and 1959 and 1960. Between 1958 and 1959 he studied at University of California, Berkeley.

From 1952 to 1968 Nabulsi worked for the Central Bank of Syria. After his time in Syria Nabulsi moved to Jordan, where he went to work at the Central Bank of Jordan. While at the same working as a lecturer for the University of Amman. In 1972 he joined the government of Prime Minister Ahmad al-Lawzi as Minister of National Economy. He served for one year, when he became Governor of the Central Bank of Jordan, at this time he also stopped working as a lecturer at the university. After Zaid al-Rifai became prime minister in 1985, Nabulsi left his position and started working as an adviser to the International Monetary Fund. During this time he also headed the United Nations Economic and Social Commission for Western Asia, and was an Under Secretary General. In 1989 he once more became the Governor of the Central Bank of Jordan after being appointed by Premier Zaid ibn Shaker. When Nabulsi was appointed as governor upon the request of King Hussein, his mission was to try to make an end to the economic bad times for Jordan. He tried to do so by strengthening Jordan's currency, the dinar. As the Central Bank lacked foreign currency Nabulsi ordered all banks to stash 35% of their foreign currency at the Central Bank. The Petra Bank, chaired by Iraqi Ahmed Chalabi, failed to do so. An investigation into the situation at Petra Bank uncovered that some of the bank's assets not really existed, leading to accusations of false accounting and embezzlement. The bank failed, resulting in a bail-out operation by the central bank worth $350 million in 1989. Chalabi was later sentenced to 22 years imprisonment with hard labour in absentia. Nabulsi's five-year term ended in 1994 and he was reappointed for another term. He resigned as of 1 January 1996.

During his career Nabulsi also worked for the United Nations Industrial Development Organization as a financial expert, and as a professor for the Syrian Private University.

== Personal life ==
Nabulsi married in September 1957 in Damascus to Naila Nabulsi. The couple had three children. He died on 23 July 2013.
