= Mohammad Dabbas =

Jordanian politician (1927–2014)

Mohammad Abdul Razaq Dabbas

Minister of Finance
- In office 1976–1979
- Monarch: Hussein of Jordan
- Prime Minister: Mudar Badran
- Preceded by: Salem Massadeh
- Succeeded by: Salem Massadeh

Personal details
- Born: 1927 As-Salt, Jordan
- Died: August 21, 2014
- Education: University of Texas (M)

Mohammad Abdul Razaq Dabbas (1927 – 21 August 2014) was a Jordanian politician. Dabbas was born in Salt. He studied economics at the University of Texas, receiving a master's degree. He also completed a study of administration of University of California. Dabbas returned to Jordan and worked amongst others as director general of the Income and Sales Tax Department and the State Budget Department. He later served as Minister of Finance between 1976 and 1979 in the government of Mudar Badran. During his time in office he was engaged in obtaining financial aid for Jordan. In 1979 he obtained funding from Libya, which had severed ties from Jordan from 1970, for the funding a fertiliser plant near Aqaba and a potash mine near the Dead Sea. For the 1980 fiscal year he expected that Jordan would continue to keep the same financial aid from Arab partners, while seeing a decline in US contributions.
