= Ziad Fariz =

Jordanian politician

Governor of the Central Bank of Jordan
- In office 2012–2022
- Preceded by: Mohammed Said Shahin
- Succeeded by: Adel Al-Sharkas
- In office 1996–2000
- Preceded by: Mohammed Said Nabulsi
- Succeeded by: Umayya Toukan

Personal details
- Born: 1943 (age 82–83)
- Education: Keele University; University of Baghdad
- Occupation: Economist

Ziad Fariz (born 1943) is a Jordanian banker, politician and economist and former Governor of the Central Bank of Jordan.

He was born in 1943 in As-Salt. He has a PhD in Economics from Keele University in the United Kingdom, and a BA from the University of Baghdad.

Fariz joined the Central Bank in 1966, and after completing his PhD in 1978, he returned to the Central Bank as an Economic Advisor. He later served as Director of both the Research Department and the Investment and Foreign Operations Department. In 1984, he was appointed Secretary General of the Ministry of Planning and International Cooperation, a position he held until April 1989, when he was promoted to Minister until December 1989. He subsequently served as Minister of Trade from June 1989 to September 1991, and Minister of Planning and International Cooperation from September 1991 to September 1994. He co-founded Capital Bank in 1995, where he also became chairman of the board.

In 1996, Fariz became the Governor of the Central Bank of Jordan, a position he held until 2001. He then served as CEO of Bank ABC from September 2005 to October 2007. From November 2005 to September 2007, he was Deputy Prime Minister of Jordan and Minister of Finance from 2006 to 2007. He was the chairman of the Board of Directors of Capital Bank, where he worked until February 2009. After this, he went to First Investment Group, as Chairman of the Board.

On 10 January 2012, he was reappointed as Governor of the Central Bank of Jordan. He served in that role until 2022.
