= Mohamad Al Ississ =

Jordanian politician

- محمد العسعس
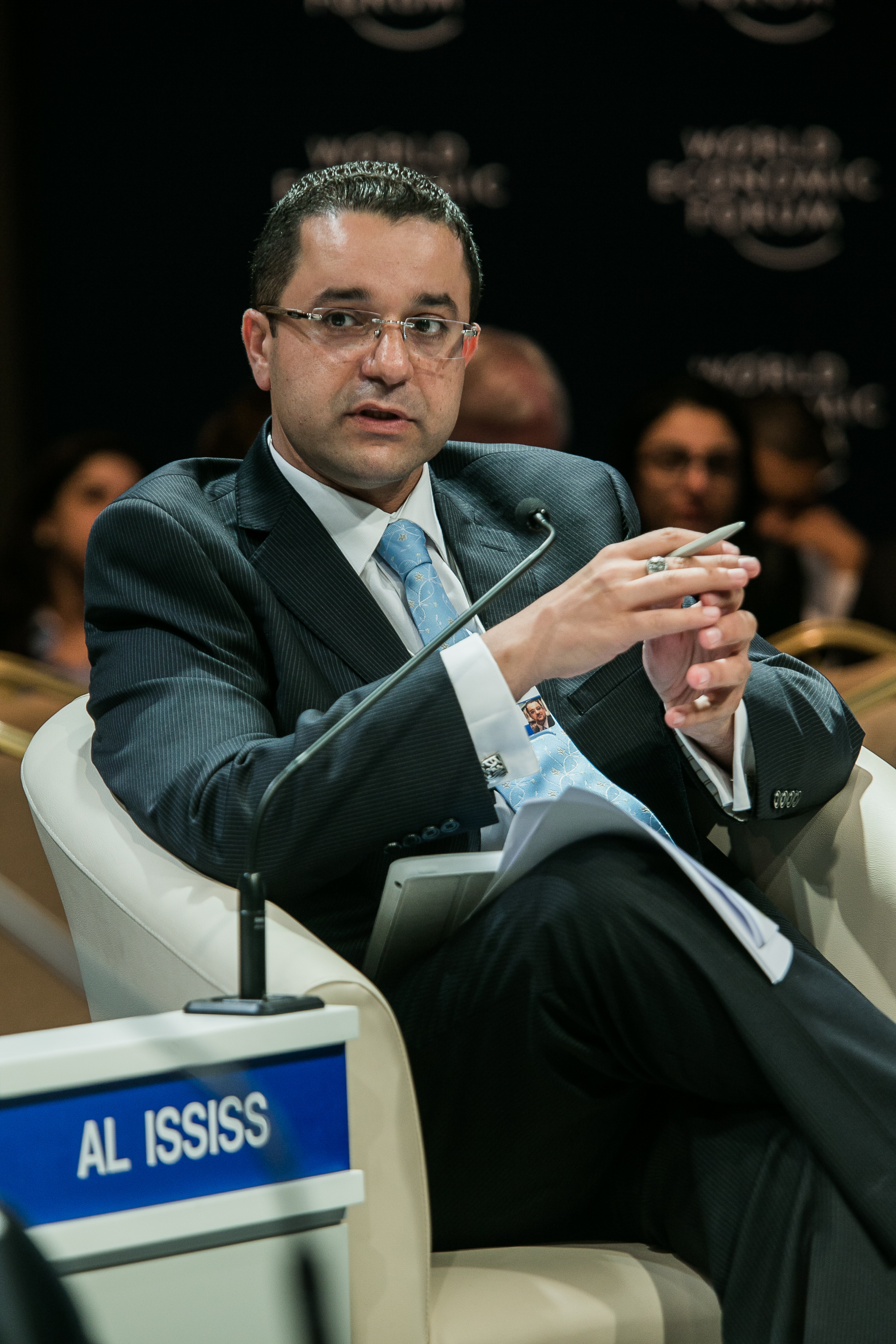
- Al Ississ in 2013

Minister of Finance
- Incumbent
- Assumed office 7 November 2019
- Monarch: Abdullah II of Jordan
- Prime Minister: Bisher Al-Khasawneh
- Preceded by: Ezzedin Kanakrieh

Minister of Planning and International Cooperation
- In office 2019 – 7 November 2019
- Prime Minister: Omar Razzaz
- Succeeded by: Wissam Rabadi

Minister of State for Economic Affairs
- In office 2018 – 7 November 2019

Personal details
- Born: Mohamad Al Issis; July 7, 1977 (age 49)
- Education: Harvard University (BA, MA, MPAID, PhD)

Mohamad Al Ississ was the Jordanian Minister of Finance. He was appointed as minister in November 2019. Previously he had served as Minister of Planning and International Cooperation and Minister of State for Economic Affairs in Omar Razzaz's Cabinet led by Omar Razzaz. He was formerly Special Advisor to His Majesty King Abdullah II, Advisor to His Majesty King Abdullah II for Economic Affairs, and Director of Economic and Social Development in the Office of His Majesty at the Royal Hashemite Court.

Earning his PhD in Economic Development and Public Policy from Harvard University, Dr. Al-Ississ also obtained two master's degrees from Harvard in Public Administration/International Development and Middle Eastern Studies, as well as a bachelor's degree in economics with Honors.

Dr. Al-Ississ has extensive experience in academia. From 2010 to 2016 he was an Assistant Professor and Associate Dean at the American University in Cairo, as well as a visiting lecturer at Harvard Kennedy School. He is also a founding professor of the first massive Arabic course at Edraak, an online learning platform in partnership with Harvard University and MIT's EdX platform.

Dr. Al-Ississ’ professional positions include Associate Consultant at Boston Consultancy Group; Manager for Investment Promotion at USAID's AMIR program; and Senior Competition Advisor to Jordan's Minister of Industry and Trade.

Dr. Al-Ississ is a member of the Global Agenda Council at the World Economic Forum, a Fulbright scholar, and a published author in top tier academic journals. His policy briefs have been circulated by the World Economic Forum. His research focuses on the political economy of the Arab World and its transition, polarization, behavioral economics and finance, economics of political violence and religious experience. Al-Ississ is a frequent commentator on CNN and BBC in addition to contributing to leading regional and international print media.

== Education ==
Ph.D in Public Policy Focus: Economic Development from Harvard University 2007–2010.

Masters in Public Administration / International Development from Harvard University 2005–2007. Awarded Fulbright scholarship after ranking first in Jordan's national selection.

Master in Middle Eastern Studies From Harvard University 1999–2000.

Bachelor in Economics with honors and advanced standing status from Harvard College 1996–2000.

== Academic Experience ==
The American University in Cairo

- School of Global Affairs and Public Policy, Associate Dean
- School of Business, Economics Department, Tenured Associate Professor
- School of Business, Economics Department, Assistant Professor

Harvard Kennedy School

- Cambridge MA, Visiting Scholar.

Professor Nicholas Burns, former Undersecretary of State, asserted in the appointment statement: “Dr. Al-Ississ brings an intimate knowledge of the economics and politics of the Arab region and an exceptional understanding of the intricacies of the Arab uprisings to this position. He will be a valuable addition to intellectual life at the Harvard Kennedy School.”

- Cambridge MA, Lecturer Mid-career MPA Program.

Edraak MOOC

- Arab Economic Development: Current State and Future Trajectory.

Harvard College, Quincy House

- Resident tutor in economics, public policy and business.

== Experience ==
- Special Advisor to His Majesty King Abdullah II of Jordan, The Royal Hashemite Court
- Economic Advisor to His Majesty King Abdullah II of Jordan, The Royal Hashemite Court
- Director, Economic and Social Development, The Royal Hashemite Court
- Associate Consultant, The Boston Consulting Group.
- Senior Competition Advisor to Jordanian ministers of Industry and Trade
- Manager for Investment Promotion at USAID's AMIR program

== Fellowships and Appointments ==
- Jordan's Governor to the IMF, World Bank and other IFIs.
- Fellow, The Economic Research Forum
- Member, Global Future Council on Economic Growth and Social Inclusion.
- Member, Global Agenda Council on the Arab World, The World Economic Forum.
- Faculty Fellow, Association for Analytic Learning about Islam and Muslim Societies
- Member, Presidential Advisory Council, The American University in Cairo.
- Fellow: Multidisciplinary University Research Initiative grant.
- Fellow: Harvard University Belfer Center's Dubai Initiative.
- Fellow: Harvard Program On Negotiations.
- Fellow: Harvard Kennedy School Presidential Public Service Program.
