= Fahd Jaradat =

Jordanian politician, officer and diplomat

Fahd Mohammad Musa Jaradat
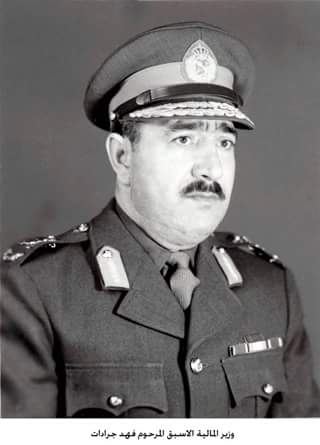
- السيد فهد جرادات

Minister of Finance
- In office 1970
- Monarch: Hussein I of Jordan
- Prime Minister: Ahmad Toukan
- Preceded by: Abdul-Qadir Tash
- Succeeded by: Fawwaz Al-Rousan

Personal details
- Born: 1930 Bushra
- Died: May 19, 2015

Fahd Mohammad Musa Jaradat (1930 – 19 May 2015) was a Jordanian soldier and politician who served as Minister of Finance in 1970.

Jaradat was born in Bushra in 1930. He joined the Jordanian Armed Forces in 1948. He amongst others held the post of military attaché in Iran.

In 1970 he was named Finance Minister.
