= Marwan Awad =

Jordanian former minister and economist

- Marwan Awad

Minister of Finance
- In office 1996–1997

Secretary General of Ministry of Industry and Trade
- In office 1992–1995

Personal details
- Born: 1951 (age 74–75) Jordan
- Education: University of Jordan; Vanderbilt University
- Occupation: Economist, business executive, politician

Marwan Awad (born 1951) is a Jordanian economist and Minister of Finance of Jordan, from 1996 to 1997. He has held senior positions in the banking sector, including as Chief Executive Officer of Jordan Ahli Bank from 2006 to 2016. He also was chairman of the Association of Banks in Jordan and has authored books on finance and economics.

== Early life and education ==
Awad was born in 1951. He obtained a bachelor's degree in business management from the University of Jordan. He later earned a master's degree in economics from Vanderbilt University in the United States.

== Career ==
Awad held senior positions in both the public and private sectors, including leadership roles in government and the banking sector.

=== Government roles ===
Awad was Minister of Finance of Jordan from 1996 to 1997. He was previously Secretary General of the Ministry of Industry and Trade between 1992 and 1995. He also was chairman of the Social Security Investment Fund.

=== Banking and financial sector ===
Awad held executive leadership positions in several financial institutions in Jordan and the region. He has been:

- Chief Executive Officer of Jordan Ahli Bank (2006–2016)
- Chief Executive Officer of Jordan Industrial Development Bank
- Chief Executive Officer of Qatar Islamic Bank
- Chief Executive Officer of Middle East Bank

He also was chairman of the Association of Banks in Jordan.

Awad has been cited in Jordanian media for commentary on monetary policy and the Jordanian economy.

=== Other roles ===
Awad has been on the boards of several financial and academic institutions, including Jordan Kuwait Bank, the Arab Academy for Banking and Financial Sciences, and Royal Jordanian.

== Publications ==
Awad has authored several books on finance and economics, focusing on topics such as International finance, foreign exchange, and business management.
