= Michel Marto =

Jordanian economist

His Excellency Michel Marto
- ميشيل مارتو
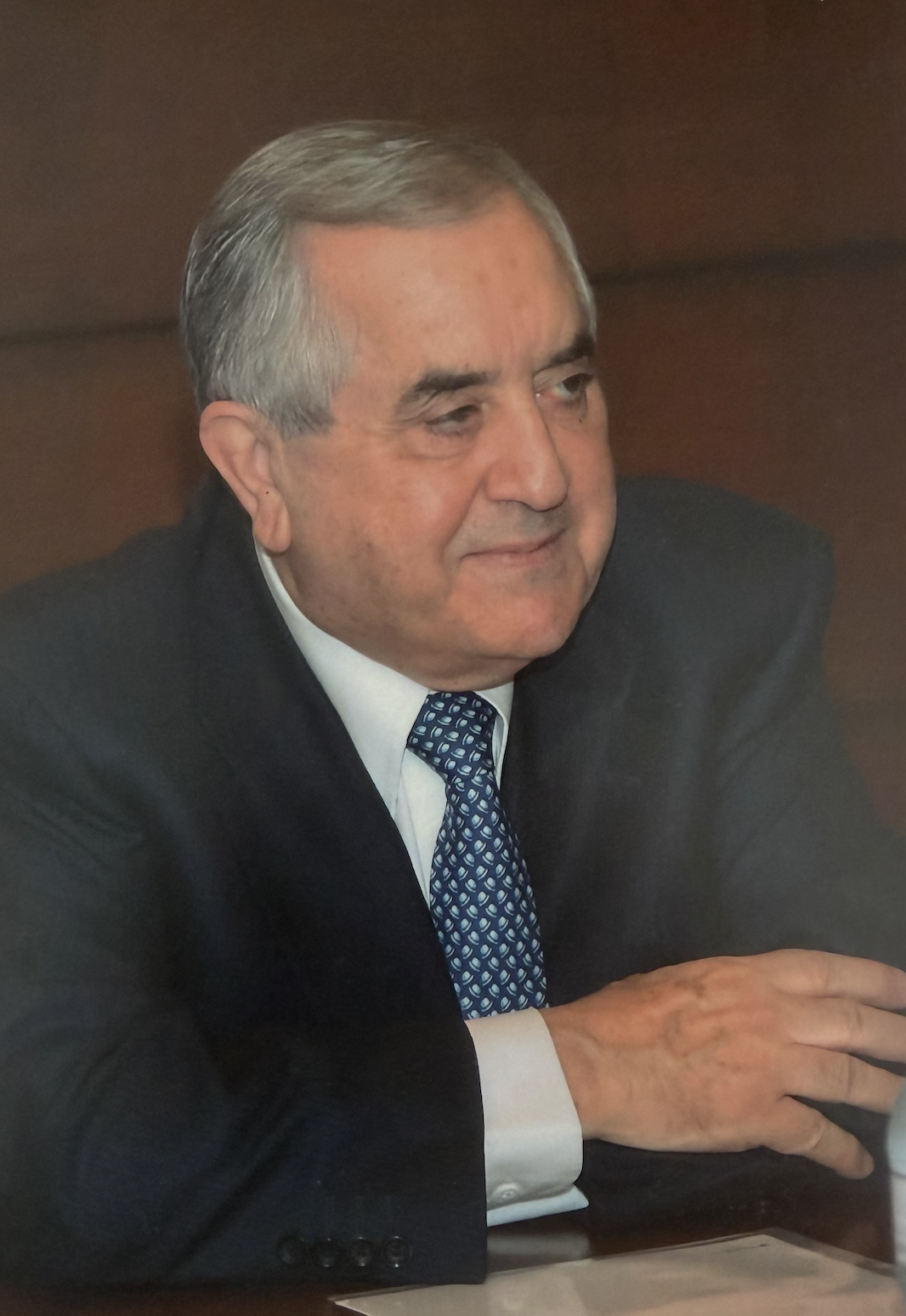

Minister of Finance
- In office 21 August 1998 – 22 October 2003
- Monarch: Hussein of Jordan
- Prime Minister: Fayez al-Tarawneh; Abdelraouf Rawabdeh; Ali Abu al-Ragheb

Personal details
- Born: 21 August 1940 (age 86) Jerusalem
- Children: 3
- Education: Middle East Technical University (BA); Stanford University (graduate studies); University of Southern California (MA, PhD)
- Awards: Order of the Star of Jordan (First Class); Order of the Star of Jordan (Second Class); Order of Independence (First Class); King Hussein Medal for Distinguished Service (Supreme First Class); Legion of Honour Commander (France); National Order of Merit Knight (France)

Michel Issa Moussa Marto (Arabic: ميشيل عيسى موسى مارتو; born 21 August 1940) is a Jordanian economist, central banker, and statesman who served as Jordan's Minister of Finance from 1998 to 2003. Widely regarded as a key architect of Jordan's economic modernization, Marto spearheaded fiscal stabilization programs, sovereign debt restructuring, privatization, and global trade integration.

== Early life and education ==
Marto was born in Jerusalem in 1940. He earned a bachelor's degree in economics and statistics from Middle East Technical University in Ankara, Türkiye, in 1962. He later pursued graduate studies in economics at Stanford University in California from 1968 to 1969, and earned a master's degree in economics in 1968 and a PhD in economics in 1970 from the University of Southern California in Los Angeles.

== Career ==
Marto began his career at the Central Bank of Jordan, where he served as the Director of Economic Research and Studies from 1969 to 1971. He later served as an advisor to Hassan bin Talal and Head of the Economics Department at the Royal Scientific Society from 1971 to 1975.

From 1975 to 1977, he worked as an economist at the World Bank in Washington, D.C. He later served as Deputy General Manager of the Jordan Fertilizer Industry Company (1977–1979).

In 1979, he joined Bank of Jordan, serving as Deputy General Manager until 1987 and as General Manager from 1987 to 1989.

In 1989, he was appointed Deputy Governor of the Central Bank of Jordan, serving until 1997. He later became Chairman of the Jordan Securities Commission (1997–1998) before being appointed Minister of Finance.

== Minister of Finance ==
Appointed as Minister of Finance in 1998 during an economic transition under King Abdullah II, Dr. Michel Marto served as the central fiscal architect of Jordan's structural modernization through 2003. Marto retained his cabinet post across three consecutive prime ministers-Fayez al-Tarawneh, Abdelraouf Rawabdeh, and Ali Abu al-Ragheb-providing fiscal continuity while representing the Kingdom as Governor at the International Monetary Fund (IMF) and World Bank.

Marto’s primary mandate focused on restoring sovereign solvency and stabilizing public finances. He led bilateral negotiations with the Paris Club of official creditors in 1999 and July 2002, securing a historic agreement that restructured $1.171 billion in external debt obligations through 2007. In tandem with debt management policies, these interventions lowered Jordan's total public debt-to-GDP ratio from 102 percent in 1999 to approximately 75 percent by 2003, while national foreign exchange reserves grew to $3.6 billion.

To build a sustainable domestic revenue base, Marto overhauled Jordan's tax architecture by standardizing the General Sales Tax (GST) at a baseline rate of 16 percent and gradually lowering import tariffs to transition away from customs duties. Concurrently, he managed the fiscal execution of Jordan’s state privatization program across key sectors, including telecommunications, mining, and utilities. The program generated 1.7 billion Jordanian Dinars (over $2.4 billion USD) in total proceeds, which Marto legally directed into a dedicated state Debt Reduction Fund to systematically retire domestic public debt rather than financing general expenditures.

On global trade, Marto formulated the fiscal, customs, and tariff frameworks supporting Jordan’s accession to the World Trade Organization in April 2000 and the landmark 2000 United States–Jordan Free Trade Agreement. Under these agreements and the expansion of Qualifying Industrial Zones (QIZs), Jordanian exports to the United States grew from $2.4 million in 1999 to $586.6 million by 2003, raising the U.S. share of total Jordanian domestic exports from 0.9 percent to 28.5 percent.

== Housing Bank for Trade and Finance ==
During his twelve-year tenure as Chairman of the Board of Directors at The Housing Bank for Trade and Finance (HBTF) from 2004 to 2016, Dr. Michel Marto led the institution to its highest tier of international and regional recognition. Under his board governance, HBTF was named "Pioneering Bank in the Arab World" and "The Arab World's Leading Bank in Financial Inclusion" by the World Union of Arab Banks in 2016. The bank was also repeatedly awarded "Bank of the Year in Jordan" by The Banker (Financial Times Group) in 2011, 2013, and 2015, as well as "Best Bank in Jordan" by Euromoney in 2007 and Banker Middle East in 2016. In 2009, HBTF achieved a major regional operational milestone, becoming the first financial institution in Jordan and the entire Arab region to secure full compliance certification with International Internal Audit Standards from the U.S. Institute of Internal Auditors (IIA).

Alongside these institutional accolades, Marto directed a period of record commercial growth and structural expansion. Under his governance, HBTF's total assets grew to 7.9 billion JOD (~$11.1 billion USD) with customer deposits reaching 5.8 billion JOD. Annual pre-tax profits hit a record 177 million JOD (~$250 million USD) in 2015, while maintaining an exceptional capital adequacy ratio of 17% and a liquidity ratio of 145% through the post-2008 economic climate. Marto expanded HBTF’s regional presence to 181 branches across eight MENA markets, while concurrently serving as Chairman of the Association of Banks in Jordan (ABJ) to coordinate sector-wide liquidity and risk standards alongside the Central Bank of Jordan.

== Other positions ==
Throughout his career, Marto held several positions in economic, financial, educational, and institutional organizations, including:

- Chairman of the International Bank for Trade & Finance (Syria)
- Chairman of the Housing Bank for Trade & Finance (Algeria)
- Chairman of the Association of Banks in Jordan
- Chairman of the Jordan Mortgage Refinance Company
- Chairman of the Industrial Development Bank
- Board member of the Arab Potash Company
- Current Board member of the King Hussein Cancer Center
- Vice Chairman of Yarmouk University

== National honors ==
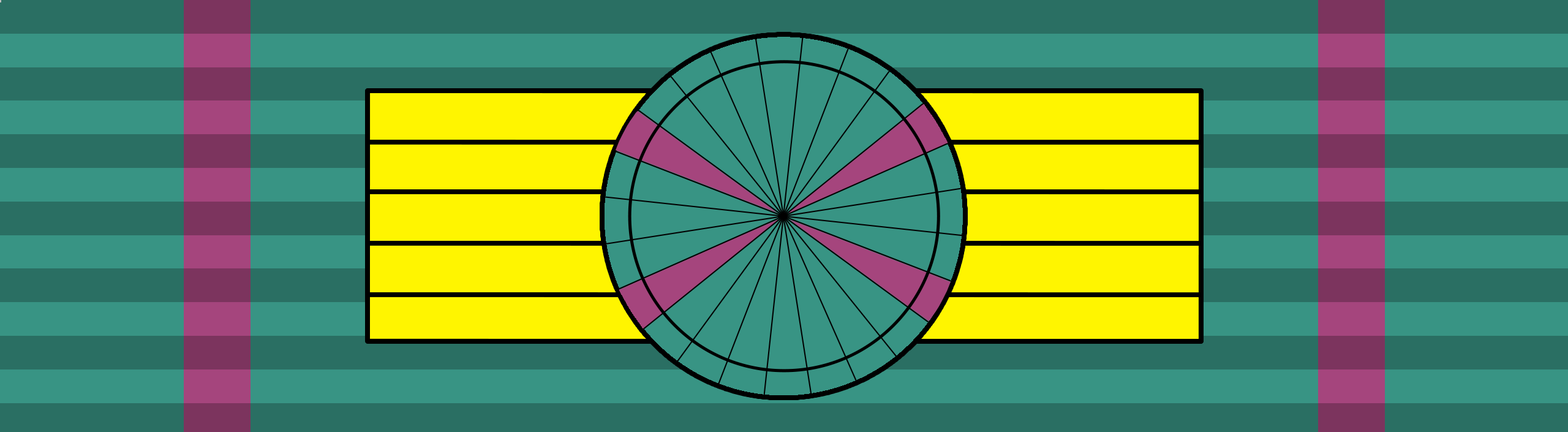
Grand Cordon of the Order of the Star of Jordan

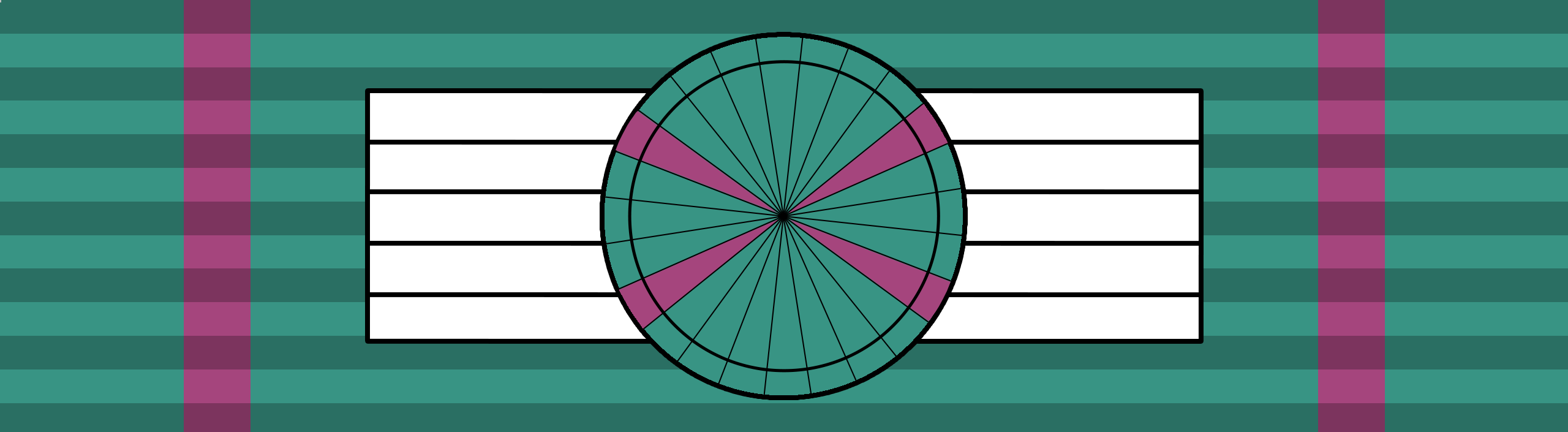
Commander of the Order of the Star of Jordan

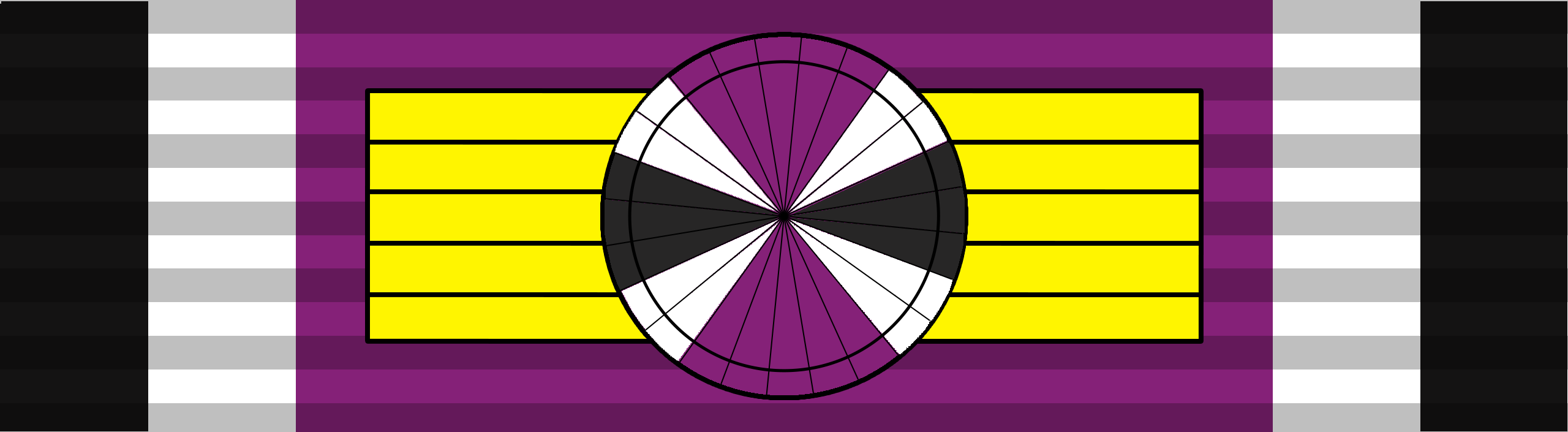
Grand Cordon of the Order of Independence

Supreme First Class of the Order of Al-Hussein for Distinguished Contributions

== Foreign honors ==
Commander of the Legion of Honour

Knight of the National Order of Merit (France)

== Personal life ==
Marto is married with one son and two daughters.
