= Jordanian dinar =

Currency of Jordan

دينار أردني (Arabic)
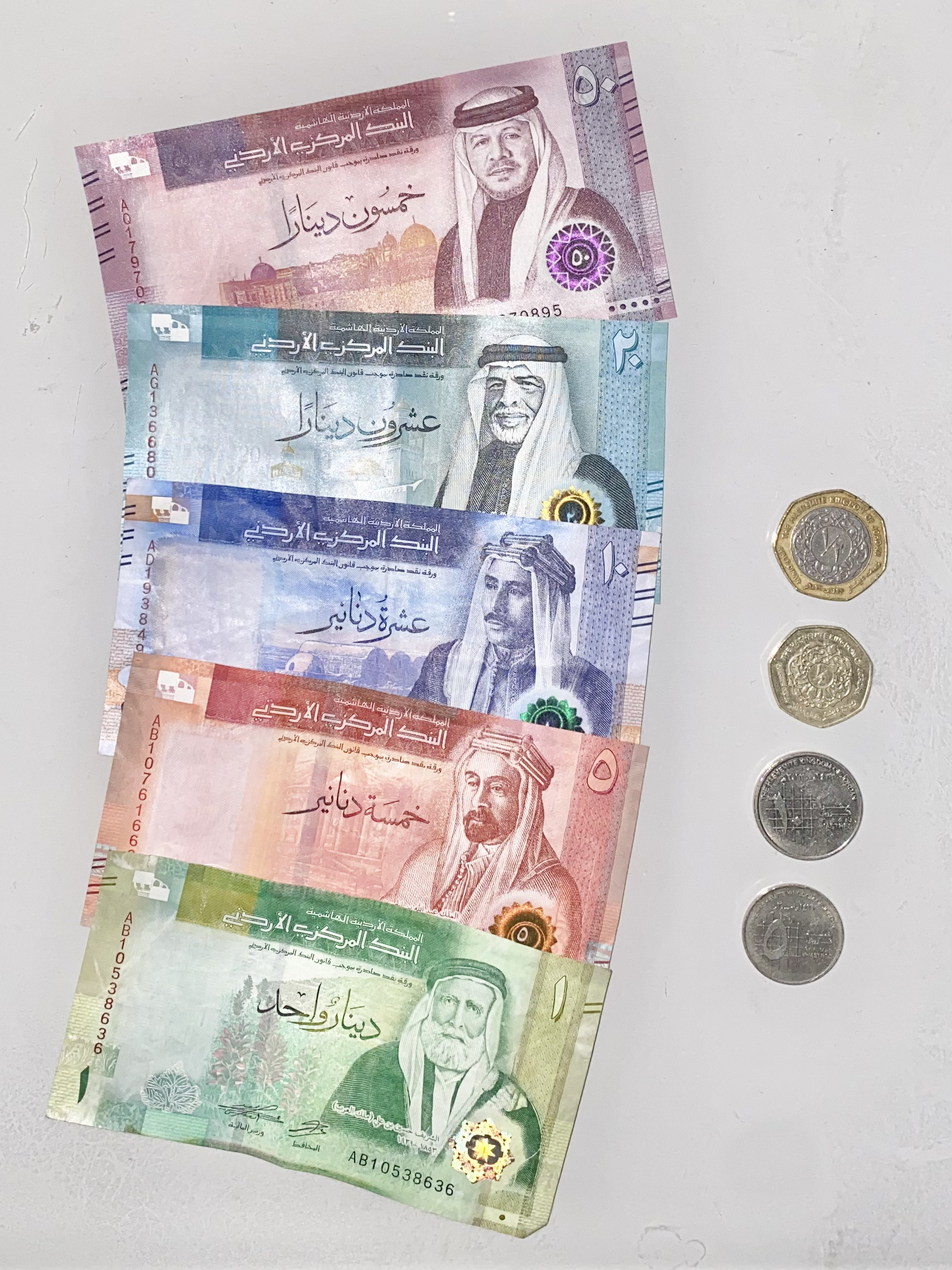
- Fifth edition Jordanian bank notes and coins

ISO 4217
- Code: JOD (numeric: 400)
- Subunit: 0.001

Units of account
- Base unit: dinar
- Plural: danānīr (Arabic)
- Symbol: JD, or د.أ (Arabic)
- Subunit
- 1/10: dirham
- 1/100: qirsh or piastre
- 1/1000: fils

Denominations
- Banknotes: 1, 5, 10, 20, 50 dinars
- Coins: 1, 5, 10 piastres/qirsh, 1/4, 1/2 dinar

Demographics
- Date of introduction: 1949
- Replaced: Palestine pound
- Official user(s): Jordan
- Unofficial user: West Bank

Issuance
- Central bank: Jordan Currency Board (1950–1964); Central Bank of Jordan (1964–present)
- Website: www.cbj.gov.jo

Valuation
- Inflation: 1.35%
- Source: The World Factbook, 2021 est.
- Pegged with: US dollar US$ = د.أ 0.71 (buy); US$ = د.أ 0.718 (sell)

The Jordanian dinar (Arabic: دينار أردني; code: JOD; symbol: د.أ, unofficially abbreviated as JD) has been the currency of Jordan since 1950. The Central Bank of Jordan commenced operations in 1965 and became the sole issuer of Jordanian currency and central bank, in place of the Jordan Currency Board.

Each dinar, the base unit, is divided into 100 qirsh (also called piastres); and is also divided into 10 dirham and 1000 fulus (singular is fils). Fils are effectively obsolete; however, monetary amounts are still written to three decimal places representing fils. It is pegged to the US dollar.

== History ==
In 1927, the British administration of the Palestinian Mandate established the Palestine Currency Board which issued the Palestine pound which was the official currency in both Mandatory Palestine and the Emirate of Transjordan. Though Jordan became an independent kingdom on 25 May 1946, it continued to use the Palestinian pound for a while. In 1949, it passed the Provisional Act No. 35 of 1949, which established the Jordan Currency Board as the sole authority in the kingdom entitled to issue Jordanian currency, called the Jordanian dinar. The Board was based in London and consisted of a president and four members, and began issuing Jordanian dinars in 1949 and was exchangeable for Palestinian pounds at parity.

After Jordanian rule of the West Bank in April 1950, the dinar replaced the Palestinian pound. On 1 July 1950, the Jordanian dinar became the kingdom's official currency and legal tender. The use of the Palestine pound ceased in the country on 30 September 1950. The Central Bank of Jordan was established in 1959 and took over note production in 1964. In 1967, Jordan lost control of the West Bank, but the Jordanian dinar continued to be used there. It continues to be widely used in the West Bank alongside the Israeli shekel.

In 1988 and 1989, the dinar depreciated substantially due to mounting foreign debts in the kingdom. During that time, there were protests across the country.

== Coins ==
Coins were introduced in 1949 in denominations of 1, 5, 10, 20, 50 and 100 fils. The first issue of 1 fils were mistakenly minted with the denomination given as "1 fil". 20 fils coins were minted until 1965, with 25 fils introduced in 1968 and 1/4 dinar coins in 1970. The 1 fils coin was last minted in 1985. In 1996, smaller 1/4 dinar coins were introduced alongside 1/2 and 1 dinar coins.

Until 1992, coins were denominated in Arabic using fils, qirsh, dirham and dinar but in English only in fils and dinar. Since 1992, the fils and dirham are no longer used in the Arabic and the English denominations are given in dinar and either qirsh or piastres.

Fifth issue (2000)
Image		Value	Diameter (mm)	Mass (g)	Composition	Edge	Obverse	Reverse	Issue	Other terms
Obverse	Reverse	Value	Diameter (mm)	Mass (g)	Composition	Edge	Obverse	Reverse	Issue	Other terms
		1 qirsh	25.00	5.50	Copper-plated steel	Plain	Abdullah II bin al-Hussein	Lettering: The Hashemite Kingdom of Jordan; value (English and Arabic); year of issue (Hijri and Gregorian)	2000	
		5 piastres (qirsh)	26.00	5.00	Nickel-plated steel	Milled	Abdullah II bin al-Hussein	Lettering: The Hashemite Kingdom of Jordan; value (English and Arabic); year of issue (Hijri and Gregorian)	2000	50 fils Shilin
		10 piastres (qirsh)	28.00	8.00	Nickel-plated steel	Milled	Abdullah II bin al-Hussein	Lettering: The Hashemite Kingdom of Jordan; value (English and Arabic); year of issue (Hijri and Gregorian)	2000	100 fils Bareezah
		1/4 dinar	26.50 (Heptagonal)	7.40	Brass	Plain	Abdullah II bin al-Hussein	Lettering: The Hashemite Kingdom of Jordan; value (English and Arabic); year of issue (Hijri and Gregorian)	2004	Rub'a (Note: rub'a is Arabic for "piece of four" or "quarter".); 25 piastres 250 fils
		1/2 dinar	29.00 (Heptagonal)	9.60	Outer: Aluminium bronze	Plain	Abdullah II bin al-Hussein	Lettering: The Hashemite Kingdom of Jordan; value (English and Arabic); year of issue (Hijri and Gregorian)	2000	Nusf (Note: nusf is Arabic for "piece of two" or "half".); 50 piastres 500 fils
		1/2 dinar	29.00 (Heptagonal)	9.60	Inner: Cupronickel	Plain	Abdullah II bin al-Hussein	Lettering: The Hashemite Kingdom of Jordan; value (English and Arabic); year of issue (Hijri and Gregorian)	2000	Nusf; 50 piastres 500 fils

== Banknotes ==
The Central Bank of Jordan is the sole authority to issue Jordanian banknotes since its establishment in 1964. It released into circulation its first series of Jordanian notes on August 4, 1965. From 1949 to 1965, currency issue was entrusted in the Jordan Currency Board. Before 1949, the Palestinian pound was used.

In 1949, banknotes were issued by the Jordan Currency Board in denominations of 1/2, 1, 5, 10 and 50 dinars. They bore the country's official name, "The Hashemite Kingdom of the Jordan". 20 dinar notes were introduced in 1977. The 1/2 dinar notes were replaced by coins in 1999 and the 50 dinar note was re-issued in 2000.

=== Issues by the Jordan Currency Board ===
==== First issue ====
First issue (1949–1952)
Image		Value	Dimensions (mm)	Main colour	Description		Issue
Obverse	Reverse	Value	Dimensions (mm)	Main colour	Obverse	Reverse	Issue
		500 fils	128 x 76	Purple	Wadi Al Arab irrigation project	Shepherd with his flock	1949 (Gregorian) 1368 (Hijri)
		1 dinar	160 x 86	Green	Abdullah I bin al-Hussein	Oval Plaza, Jerash	1949 (Gregorian) 1368 (Hijri)
		5 dinars	169 x 88	Red	Abdullah I bin al-Hussein	Al-Khazneh	1949 (Gregorian) 1368 (Hijri)
		10 dinars	185 x 97	Blue	Abdullah I bin al-Hussein	Al-Khazneh	1949 (Gregorian) 1368 (Hijri)
		50 dinars	190 x 100	Brown	Abdullah I bin al-Hussein	Aqaba	1949 (Gregorian) 1368 (Hijri)

==== Second issue ====
Second issue (1952–1965)
Image		Value	Dimensions (mm)	Main colour	Description		Issue
Obverse	Reverse	Value	Dimensions (mm)	Main colour	Obverse	Reverse	Issue
		500 fils	128 x 76	Purple	Wadi Al Arab irrigation project	Shepherd with his flock	1952 (Gregorian) 1371 (Hijri)
		1 dinar	160 x 86	Green	Hussein bin Talal	Oval Plaza, Jerash	1952 (Gregorian) 1371 (Hijri)
		5 dinars	169 x 88	Red	Hussein bin Talal	Al-Khazneh	1952 (Gregorian) 1371 (Hijri)
		10 dinars	185 x 97	Blue	Hussein bin Talal	Al-Khazneh	1952 (Gregorian) 1371 (Hijri)

=== Issues by the Central Bank of Jordan ===
==== First issue ====
First issue (1965–1975)
Image		Value	Dimensions (mm)	Main colour	Description		Issue
Obverse	Reverse	Value	Dimensions (mm)	Main colour	Obverse	Reverse	Issue
		1/2 dinar	140 x 70	Brown	Hussein bin Talal	Oval Forum, Jerash	4 August 1965
		1 dinar	150 x 75	Green	Hussein bin Talal	Dome of the Rock	4 August 1965
		5 dinars	164 x 82	Red	Hussein bin Talal	Al-Khazneh	4 August 1965
		10 dinars	175 x 88	Blue	Hussein bin Talal	Al-Maghtas	4 August 1965

==== Second issue ====
Second issue (1975–1992)
Image	Value	Dimensions (mm)	Main colour	Description		Issue
Image	Value	Dimensions (mm)	Main colour	Obverse	Reverse	Issue
	1/2 dinar	136 × 67.5	Brown	Hussein bin Talal	Oval Forum, Jerash	16 November 1975
	1 dinar	144 × 71.5	Green	Hussein bin Talal	Dome of the Rock	16 November 1975
	5 dinars	152 × 76	Red	Hussein bin Talal	Petra	16 November 1975
	10 dinars	160 × 80	Blue	Hussein bin Talal	Cultural Palace, Al-Hussein Youth Sports City; Roman Amphitheater, Amman	16 November 1975
	20 dinars	168 × 84	Olive green	Hussein bin Talal	Al-Hussein Thermal Power Station, Zarqa; Olive grove	3 June 1978
	20 dinars	168 × 84	Blue green	Hussein bin Talal	Al-Hussein Thermal Power Station, Zarqa; Olive grove	25 August 1990

==== Third issue ====
Third issue (1992–2002)
Image	Value	Dimensions (mm)	Main colour	Description		Issue
Image	Value	Dimensions (mm)	Main colour	Obverse	Reverse	Issue
	1/2 dinar	131 × 62	Brown	Hussein bin Talal	Qusayr 'Amra	1 August 1992
	1 dinar	137 × 66	Green	Hussein bin Talal	The Cardo, Jerash	1 August 1992
	5 dinar	143 × 70	Red	Hussein bin Talal	Al-Khazneh	1 October 1992
	10 dinar	149 × 74	Blue	Hussein bin Talal	Ajloun Castle	1 October 1992
	20 dinar	155 × 78	Olive green	Hussein bin Talal	Dome of the Rock	1 August 1992
	50 dinar	149 × 74	Brown and purple	Abdullah II	Raghadan Palace	27 January 2000

==== Fourth issue ====
Fourth issue (2002–2022)
Image		Value	Dimensions (mm)	Main colour	Description		First printing	Issue
Obverse	Reverse	Value	Dimensions (mm)	Main colour	Obverse	Reverse	First printing	Issue
		1 dinar	133 × 74	Green	Hussein bin Ali; Silver Hashemite coin	Great Arab Revolt; Supreme Order of the Renaissance	2002; 1423 AH	30 March 2003
		5 dinars	137 × 74	Orange	Abdullah I bin al-Hussein; Army inspection	Ma’an Palace; Umayyad coin minted in Jordan	2002; 1423 AH	22 December 2002
		10 dinars	141 × 74	Blue	Talal bin Abdullah; Umm Qais Museum	First Jordanian parliament; Wadi Rum; Decorative motif from Al Qastal	2002; 1423 AH	22 December 2002
		20 dinars	145 × 74	Cyan	Hussein bin Talal; King Abdullah I Mosque	Dome of the Rock	2002; 1423 AH	2 February 2003
		50 dinars	149 × 74	Brownish purple	Abdullah II bin al-Hussein	Raghadan Palace; Marble carvings from Al-Aqsa Mosque; Black iris flower	2002; 1423 AH	2 February 2003

==== Fifth issue ====
Fifth issue (2022)
Image		Value	Dimensions (mm)	Main colour	Description		First printing	Issue
Obverse	Reverse	Value	Dimensions (mm)	Main colour	Obverse	Reverse	First printing	Issue
		1 dinar	133 × 74	Green	Hussein bin Ali; Acanthus syriacus	Mountains of Wadi Rum; Sinai rosefinch	2022	26 December 2022
		5 dinars	137 × 74	Red	Abdullah I bin al-Hussein; Petra	Treasury, Petra	2022	16 August 2023
		10 dinars	141 × 74	Blue	Talal bin Abdullah; Qusayr 'Amra	Roman Theater, Amman	2022	26 July 2023
		20 dinars	145 × 74	Cyan	Hussein bin Talal; King Hussein Mosque	Wadi Mujib	2022	21 March 2023
		50 dinars	149 × 74	Purple	Abdullah II bin al-Hussein; Jerusalem, including Al-Aqsa	Wadi Rum	2022	5 February 2023

== Fixed exchange rate ==
Since October 23, 1995, the dinar has officially been pegged to the IMF's special drawing rights (SDRs), while in practice it was fixed at 1 U.S. dollar = 0.709 dinar most of the time, which is approximately 1 dinar = 1.41044 dollars. The Central Bank buys U.S. dollars at 0.708 dinar per dollar, and sells U.S. dollars at 0.710 dinar per dollar.

Current JOD exchange rates
From Google Finance:	AUD CAD CHF CNY EUR GBP HKD JPY USD ILS
From Yahoo! Finance:	AUD CAD CHF CNY EUR GBP HKD JPY USD ILS
From XE.com:	AUD CAD CHF CNY EUR GBP HKD JPY USD ILS
From OANDA:	AUD CAD CHF CNY EUR GBP HKD JPY USD ILS

A sample exchange rate of Jordanian dinars to US dollars:

Year	US Dollar =
1980	0.29 dinar
1985	0.39 dinar
1990	0.66 dinar
1995	0.70 dinar
2020	0.71 dinar

== See also ==
- British currency in the Middle East
- Economy of Jordan
- Economy of Palestine
- Iraqi dinar
