= Al-Zahra College for Women =

Private college in Oman

Coordinates: 23.612778°N 58.484525°E

- كلية الزهراء للبنات
- Type: Private
- Established: 1999
- Affiliations: Al-Ahliyya Amman University, University of Sunderland
- Location: Muscat, Oman
- Colors: White and Purple
- Website: zcw.edu.om

Al-Zahra College for Women (Arabic: كلية الزهراء للبنات, romanized: Kullīyat al-Zahrāʼ lil-Banāt) is a private college in Oman. It was founded in the academic year 1999/2000 and is located in Airport Heights Muscat, Oman.

== History ==
The Al-Zahra College for Women (ZCW) began the academic year 1999/2000 with 50 students. The college has from its foundation been associated with the Al-Ahliyya Amman University in Jordan, and is under the supervision of the Ministry of Higher Education (MoHE) of the Sultanate of Oman. When the college first opened, it offered two-year diploma courses in Computer Science, Accounting, Business Administration, Finance & Banking, English Language and Literature. On 13 April 2003, the MoHE allowed the continuation of the diploma courses as undergraduate courses. A year later, in February 2004, the college asked the MoHE for permission to begin awarding its own bachelor's degrees; this was granted. That year, the college also set up a Department of Graphic Design. For quality assurance and strategic planning a "Planning & Quality Assurance Department" was established on 1 September 2005.

On 27 May 2012 Bank Dhofar sponsored an open day at the Al Zahra College for Women which was part of an entire week of activities including exhibitions and a showcase of Omani food, traditional handicrafts and Omani fashion. The Open Day was very well attended by students and staff of the college.

== Structure and composition ==
The college currently consists of the following departments:

- General Foundation Program
- English Language & Literature
- Computer Sciences
- Managerial & Financial Sciences, covering:
  - Accounting
  - Business Administration
  - Financial & Banking Sciences
- Graphic Design
- Law
