= Museum of Parliamentary Life =

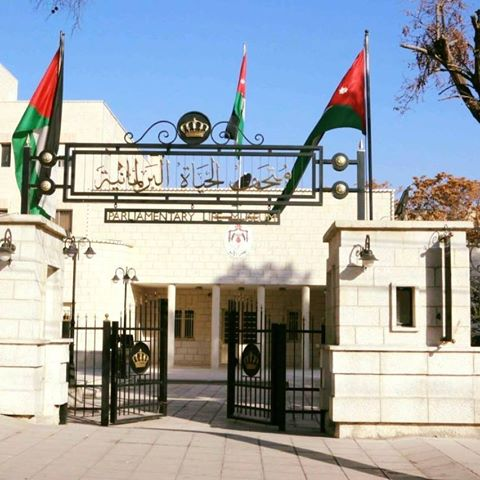
- Established: 2016
- Location: Amman, Jordan
- Type: History museum
- Visitors: 25,000

Museum of Parliamentary Life is one of the Jordanian museums, which are owned of the Jordanian Ministry of Culture, The Parliamentary Life museum is one of the first models of the parliamentary museums around the world. The Museum of Parliamentary Life aims to highlighted on the efforts exerted by the Hashemite leadership over the past decades in establishing and building Jordan.

== Located ==
The Museum of Parliamentary Life is located in Amman, the capital of the Hashemite Kingdom of Jordan, in Jabal, Amman area, near the first roundabout, at the corner of the Islamic Sciences College and Khalil Mutran street.

== Building history ==
The Parliamentary Life Museum was established in 2010, the museum first opened to the public on 6 April 2016. The museum's building was used as museum for political life between 1992 and 2005, but was never official inaugurated, an adjacent building was later constructed and is currently used for administrative purposes, containing the library and multipurpose hall. The building was used as the headquarters of the Jordan Media Centre between 2004 and 2008 after which it was returned to the Ministry of Culture. Given the sits importance to Jordanian political and social history, the Ministry of Culture has undertaken the project of reviving the Old Parliament Building, restoring it and bringing it up to museum standard, to that end a committee was formed after a decree by the prime Ministers office in 2010.

== Part of Museum ==
Parliament Hall
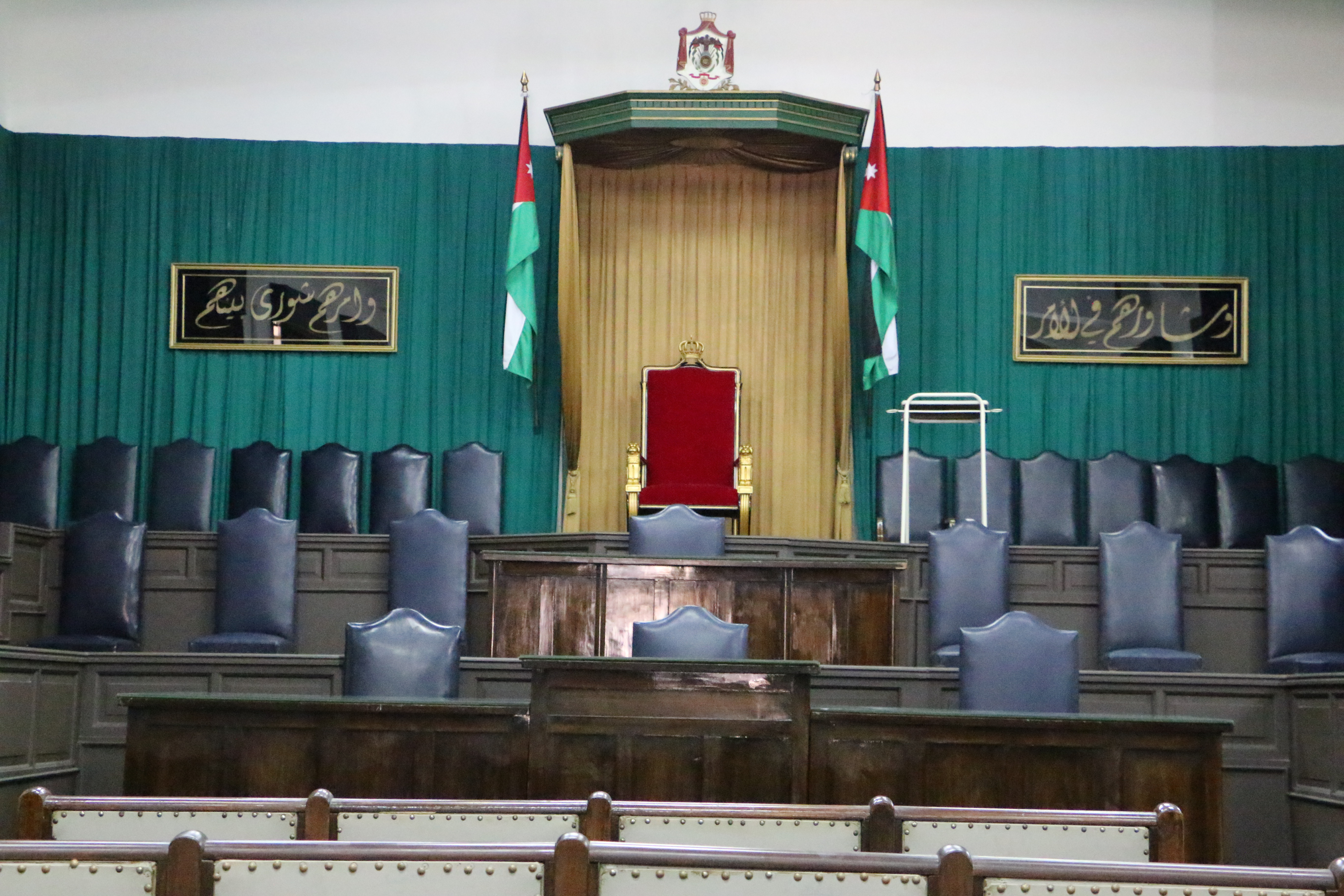

The building was used for the meetings of the Jordanian legislative council in the early forties then for the National Assembly between 1947 and 1978. It was the locale where the martyr King Abdullah I Bin al-Hussein declared the independence of the Hashemite Kingdom of Jordan on May 25, 1946. It was also there that King Tala Bin Abdullah and King Hussein Bin Talal took the oath of office.

The Parliament building consists of three wings: the middle wing containing the parliament hall, the right wing, which is the exhibition halls that tell the story of parliamentary life; the left wing which contains the offices of the head of the senate, the speaker of the parliament and VIP halls.
