= Al-Ahliyya Amman University =

University in Jordan

Al-Ahliyya Amman University (Amman University)
- جامعة عمان الأهلية
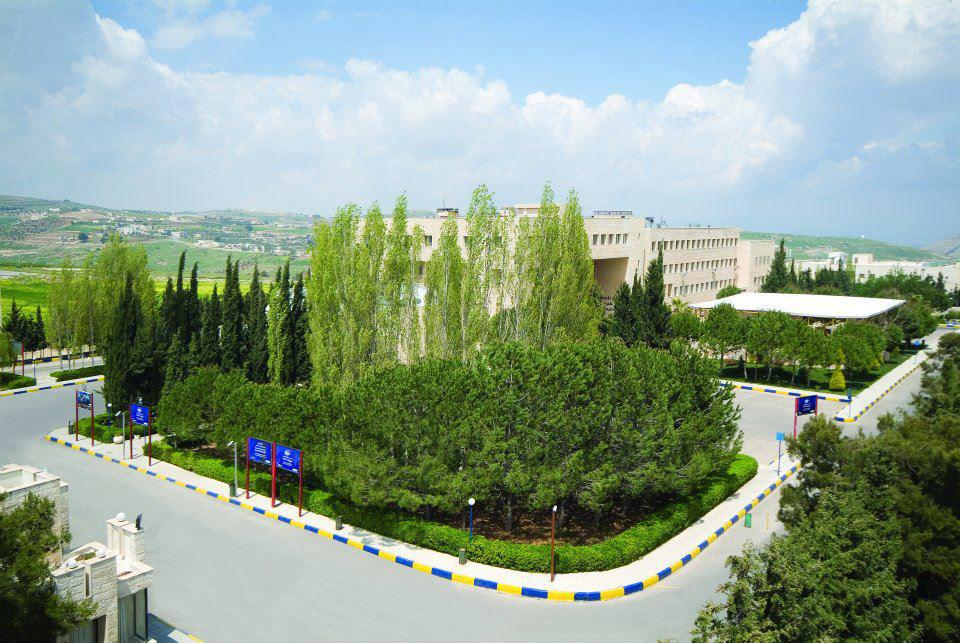
- Aerial view of AAU Campus
- Type: Private
- Established: 1990
- Affiliations: IAU, FUIW, AArU, AAPIHE
- Chairman: Mohammad Saleh Al-Hourani
- President: Prof Dr. Ahmad Hamdan
- Academic staff: 292
- Students: 5865
- Location: Balqa Governorate, Jordan
- Campus: Suburban 49.66 acres (0.2010 km^{2})
- Website: ammanu.edu.jo

Al-Ahliyya Amman University (AAU) (or Amman University, or Amman Private University) is located in Amman, Jordan. Founded in 1990, it was the first private university in Jordan. The university is accredited by the Ministry of Higher Education and Scientific Research, Jordan, and is a member of four university associations. (Note: International Association of Universities (IAU); Federation of the Universities of the Islamic World (FUIW); Union of Arab Universities and Association of Arab Private Institutions of Higher Education (AAPIHE).)

== History ==
Al-Ahliyya Amman University was the first private university in Jordan, founded in 1990 by Dr. Ahmad Al-Hourani with faculties of Law and Arts and Sciences. The university expanded to include Pharmaceutical and Medical Sciences and Engineering in 1991, with the faculty of Information Technology separating from the Arts and Sciences faculty in 2001. Nursing was added as a separate faculty in 2005, and in 2010 the university was expanded to include Architecture and Design. As of the 2009-2010 academic year, the university had approximately 6500 students and 277 faculty members.

The introduction of graduate programs began in the academic year 2005-2006 with the master's degree program in law. Later came graduate programs in clinical psychology and pharmaceutical sciences (2009–2010); then English literature, communications engineering and business administration (2010–2011).

Al-Ahliyya Amman University has been Accredited By ASIC as a Premier University with Five Platinum Crowns, ABET - Bachelor's of Networks & Information Security, IIMP - Bachelor's of Marketing. Also Al-Ahliyya Amman University has been listed in the following International Rankings, QS Four Star Rating, Times Impact Rankings - 301+, UI Green Metrics - 256

== Structure and programmes ==
The university consists of ten faculties:

- Architecture and Design
- Engineering
- Administrative and Financial Sciences
- Information Technology
- Arts & Sciences
- Law
- Nursing
- Pharmacy
- Allied Medical Sciences
- Dentistry

Through these faculties the university offers undergraduate programmes in 31 fields and 12 postgraduate degrees. The school year is divided into two 16-week semesters with an optional 8-week semester in the summer.

== Deanship of Student Affairs ==
The Student Affairs Department began in 1990 when the university was founded. In 1993 it was renamed the Deanship of Student Affairs. The Deanship organizes activities for students, such as student clubs, sports, career counselling, organizes transport, provides security services, and offers accommodation. It also publishes the school's newspaper, "Amman Al-Ahliyyah News".

== Hourani eLearning Center ==
The Hourani eLearning Center (HEC) has an Assessment Management System (AMS), which gives online exams to students. The results are available immediately after the exam and can be archived. A technical staff works with instructors to set up and implement the exams. The center includes an auditorium, which has a video conferencing system that can connect to HEC labs, and the local and international communities.

== See also ==
- List of Islamic educational institutions
