= Umayya Toukan =

Jordanian politician

- Born: Umayya Salah Ala Uddin Toukan; 1946 (age 79–80); Amman, Jordan
- Education: American University of Beirut; University of Oxford; Columbia Business School
- Occupation: Economist
- Office: Deputy Prime Minister and Minister of State for Economic Affairs
- Spouse: Lina Izziddine Mufti

Umayya Salah Ala Uddin Toukan (Arabic: أمية صلاح علاء الدين طوقان, romanized: Umayya Ṣalāḥ ʿAlāʾ ad-Dīn Ṭūqān; born 1946) is a Jordanian politician. He served as governor of the Central Bank of Jordan from 2001 to 2010, and as Minister of Finance from 2011 to 2012 and from 2013 to 2015. He currently serves as Deputy Prime Minister and Minister of State for Economic Affairs.

== Life and education ==
Toukan was born in 1946 in Amman, Jordan. He obtained his undergraduate and MBA degree from the American University of Beirut. He then joined the University of Oxford in Britain where he obtained a bachelor's degree in economic development. He later completed his PhD at Columbia Business School in 1987. He served as the CEO of the stock exchange in Jordan.

== Career and positions ==
- Served as Head of the Department of Research and Studies at the Central Bank of Jordan.
- Economic adviser to the Prime Minister.
- CEO of the Amman Stock Exchange
- Worked as an economist at the Arab Monetary Fund in Abu Dhabi from 1989 to 1991.
- Representative of Jordan at the United Nations in New York (Economic and Financial Committee) from 1973 to 1978.
- Ambassador of Jordan to the European Union, Belgium, the Netherlands and Grand Duchy of Luxembourg
- Governor of the Central Bank of Jordan on 1 January 2001 for a period of five years and was re-appointed for a second term starting 1 January 2006.
- Member of the 24th Senate of Jordan.

On 30 March 2013, Toukan was appointed Minister of Finance to the cabinet led by Abdullah Ensour.
