= List of American colleges and universities outside the United States =

This is a list of American-style colleges and universities outside the United States. It is meant to include only free-standing universities or satellite campuses, not programs by which one may study abroad at a non-American university.

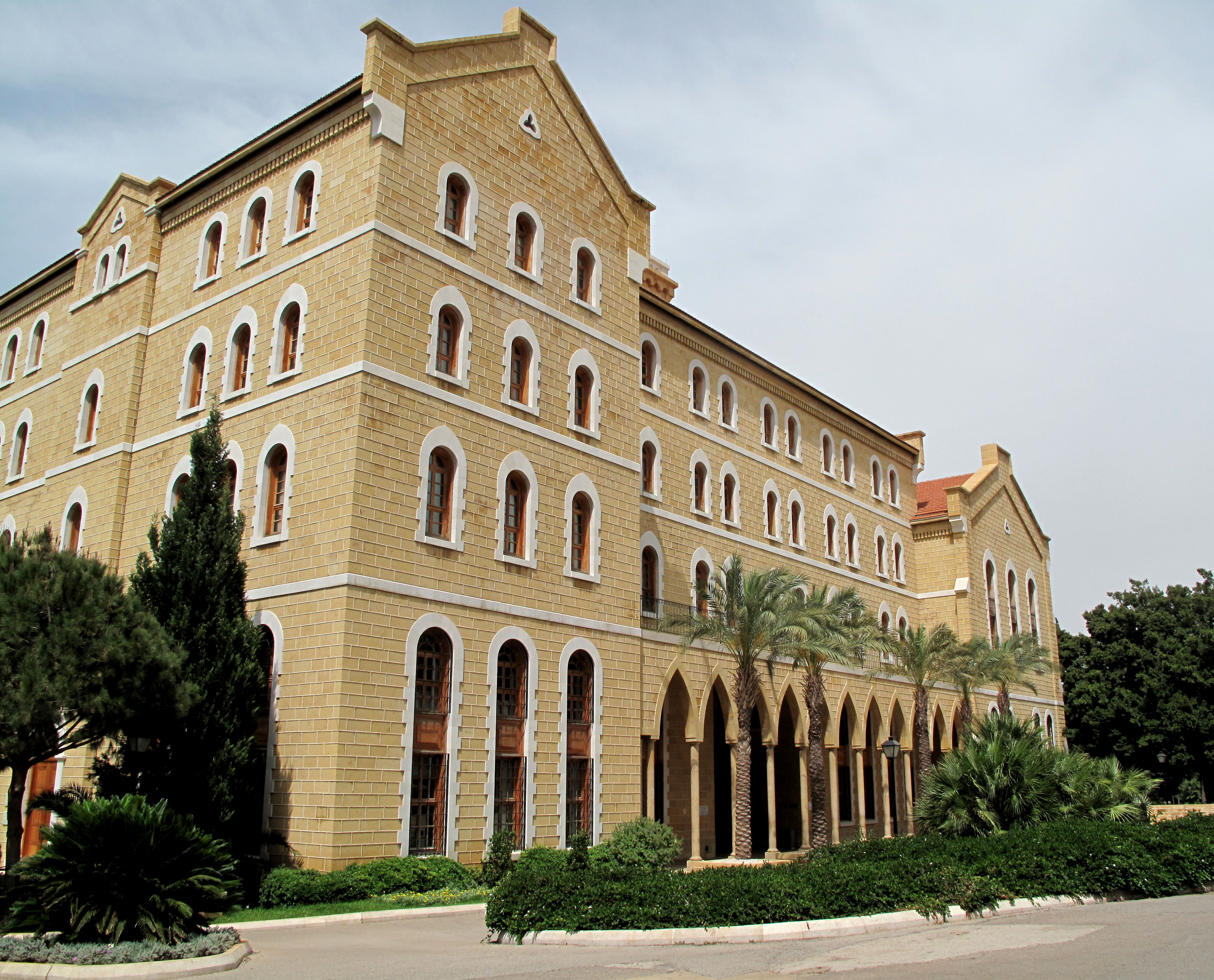
American University of Beirut

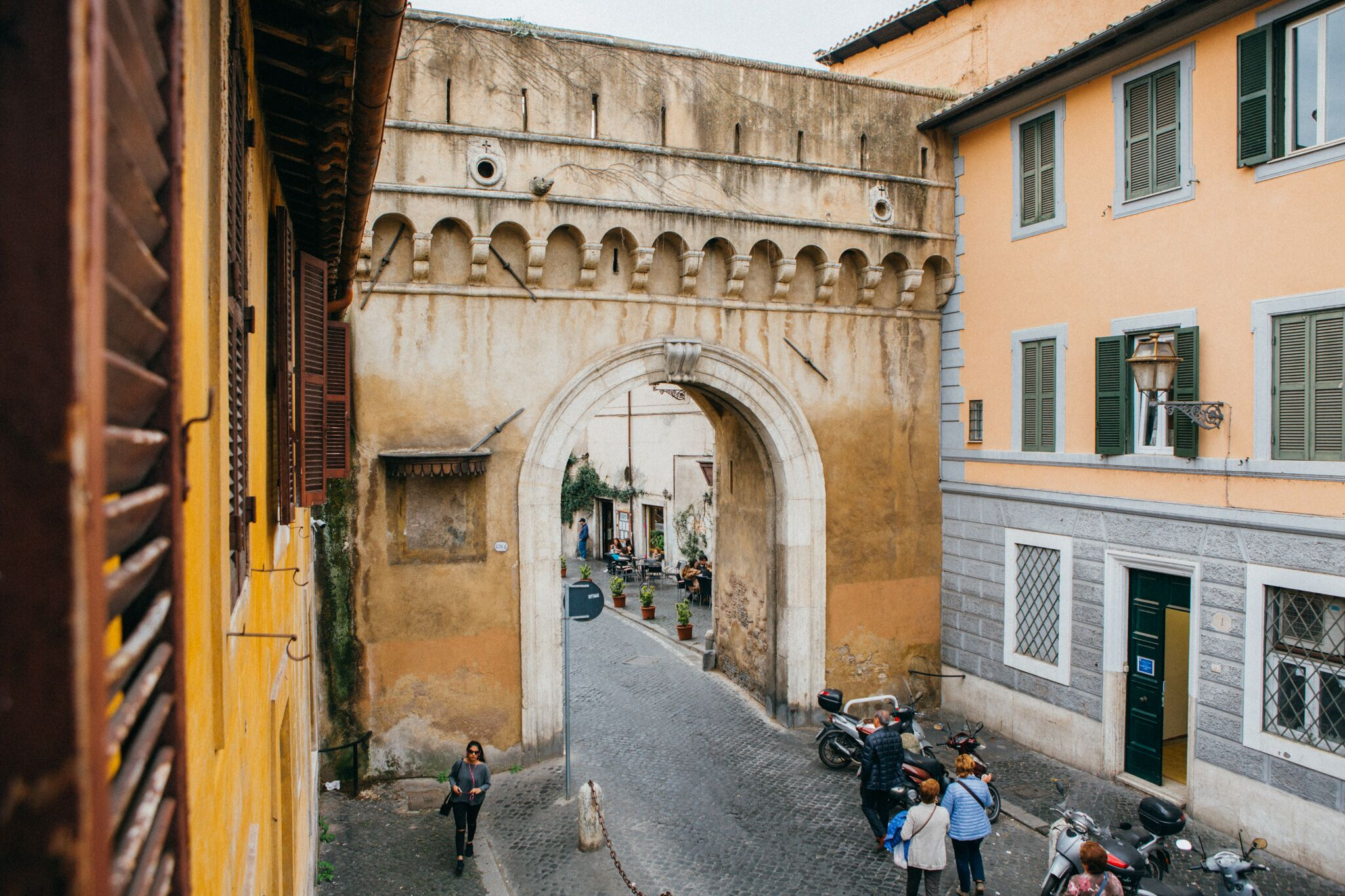
John Cabot University

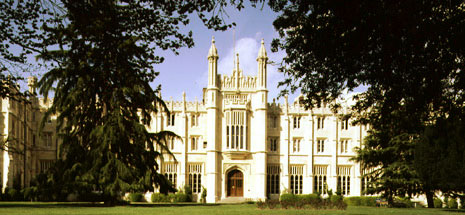
Richmond American University London

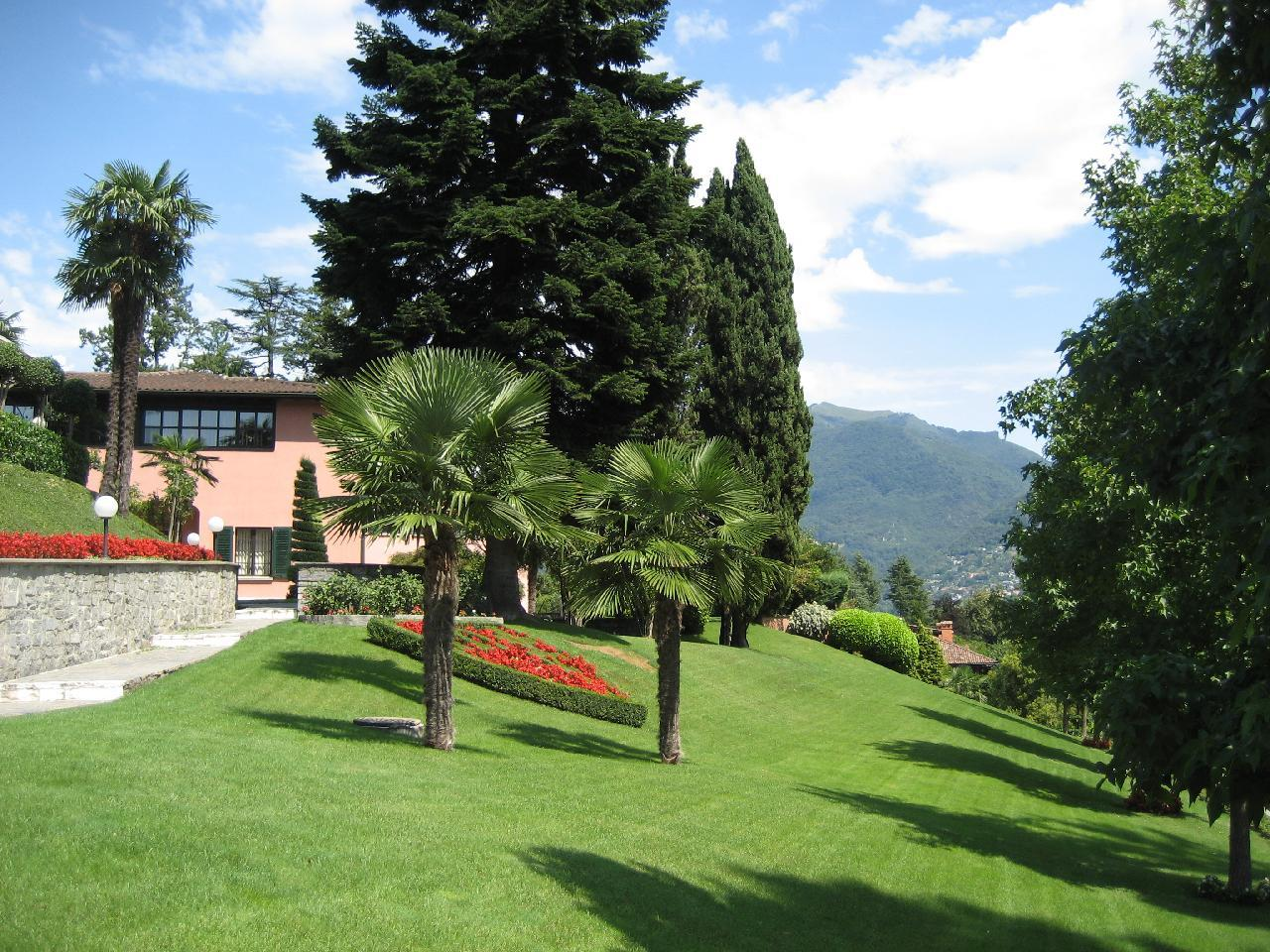
Franklin University Switzerland

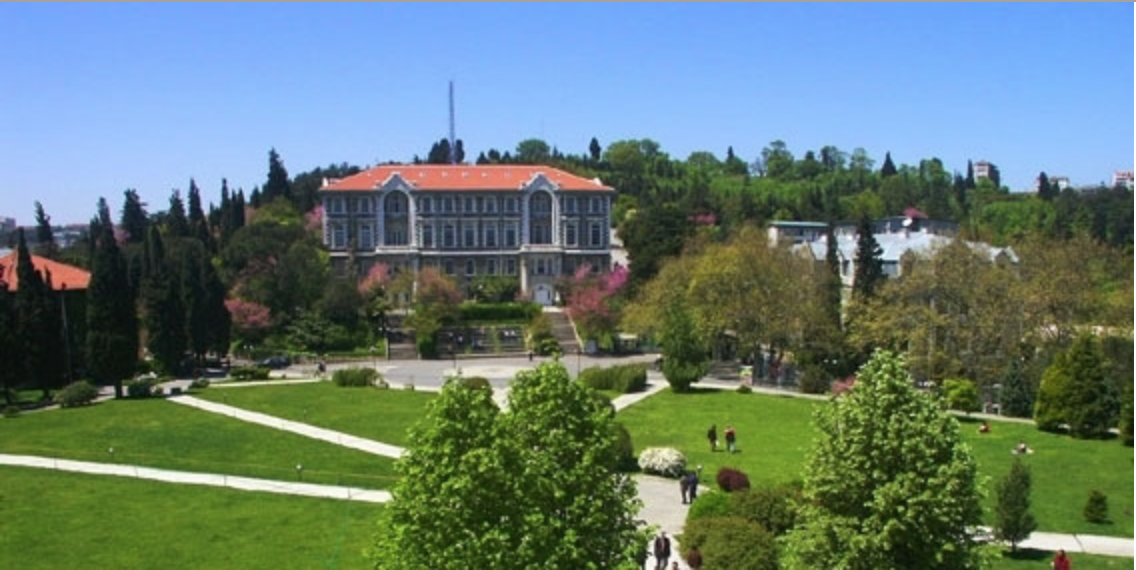
Boğaziçi University

== American-style colleges and universities outside the United States ==
Institution	City	Country	Founded	U.S. Accreditation
American University of Antigua	St. John's	Antigua and Barbuda	2004	Accredited
NYU Buenos Aires	Buenos Aires	Argentina	2000	Accredited
American University of Armenia	Yerevan	Armenia	1991	Accredited
Central European University	Vienna	Austria	1991	Accredited
Webster Vienna Private University	Vienna	Austria	1981	Accredited
American University of Bahrain	Riffa	Bahrain	2019	Accredited
Asian University for Women	Chittagong	Bangladesh	2008	Unaccredited (Candidate)
American University of Barbados	Bridgetown	Barbados	2011	Unaccredited
Bridgetown International University	Bridgetown	Barbados	2017	Unaccredited
Victoria University of Barbados	Warrens	Barbados	2017	Unaccredited
Bermuda College	Paget Parish	Bermuda	1974	Accredited
Broward International University Brazil	Belo Horizonte	Brazil	2018	Accredited
H. Lavity Stoutt Community College	Tortola	British Virgin Islands	1990	Accredited
American University in Bulgaria	Blagoevgrad	Bulgaria	1991	Accredited
American University of Phnom Penh	Phnom Penh	Cambodia	2013	Accredited
Andrés Bello National University	Santiago	Chile	1988	Accredited
Universidad Mayor	Santiago	Chile	1988	Accredited
Bryant University	Zhuhai	China	2015	Accredited
Duke Kunshan University	Kunshan	China	2014	Accredited
Johns Hopkins University Hopkins–Nanjing Center	Nanjing	China	1986	Accredited
Kean University-Wenzhou	Wenzhou	China	2012	Accredited
New York University Shanghai	Shanghai	China	2012	Accredited
INCAE Business School	Alajuela	Costa Rica	1964	Accredited
RIT Croatia	Dubrovnik and Zagreb	Croatia	1997	Accredited
American University of Cyprus	Nicosia	Cyprus	2009	Accredited
Girne American University	Kyrenia	Cyprus	1985	Accredited
Anglo-American University	Prague	Czech Republic	1990	Accredited
University of New York in Prague (UNYP)	Prague	Czech Republic	1998	Accredited
American University in Cairo	Cairo	Egypt	1919	Accredited
American University of Paris	Paris	France	1962	Accredited
Georgia Tech Europe	Metz	France	1990	Accredited
Paris College of Art	Paris	France	1981	Accredited
Parsons Paris	Paris	France	1921	Accredited
St. John's University Paris Campus	Paris	France	2008	Accredited
Schiller International University	Paris	France	1968	Accredited
The American College of the Mediterranean	Aix-en-Provence	France	1957	Accredited
San Diego State University Georgia Campus (SDSU Georgia)	Tbilisi	Georgia	2014	Accredited
Bard College Berlin	Berlin	Germany	1999	Accredited
American College of Greece	Athens	Greece	1875	Accredited
American College of Thessaloniki (ACT)	Thessaloniki	Greece	1886	Accredited
Hellenic American University	Athens	Greece	2011	Accredited
Perrotis College	Thessaloniki	Greece	1996	Accredited
McDaniel College Budapest	Budapest	Hungary	1993	Accredited
Amity University Uttar Pradesh	Noida	India	2005	Accredited
Sampoerna University	Jakarta	Indonesia	2013	Accredited
American University of Iraq, Baghdad	Baghdad	Iraq	2021	Unaccredited
American University of Iraq, Sulaimani	Sulaimani	Iraq (Kurdistan Region)	2007	Unaccredited
American University of Kurdistan, Duhok	Duhok	Iraq (Kurdistan Region)	2014	Unaccredited (Candidate)
American College Dublin	Dublin	Ireland	1993	Accredited
American University of Florence	Florence	Italy	1997	Accredited
American University of Rome	Rome	Italy	1969	Accredited
John Cabot University	Rome	Italy	1972	Accredited
Johns Hopkins University SAIS Europe	Bologna	Italy	1955	Accredited
NYU Florence	Florence	Italy	1994	Accredited
St. John's University Rome Campus	Rome	Italy	1995	Accredited
Temple University Rome	Rome	Italy	1966	Accredited
Lakeland University Japan	Tokyo	Japan	1991	Accredited
Temple University, Japan Campus	Tokyo	Japan	1982	Accredited
American University of Madaba	Madaba	Jordan	2005	Unaccredited (Candidate)
RIT Kosovo	Pristina	Kosovo	2002	Accredited
American University of Kuwait	Kuwait City	Kuwait	2003	Unaccredited (Candidate)
American University of the Middle East	Kuwait City	Kuwait	2005	Unaccredited (Candidate)
American University of Central Asia	Bishkek	Kyrgyzstan	1993	Accredited (as branch campus of Bard College)
American University of Beirut	Beirut	Lebanon	1866	Accredited
Holy Spirit University of Kaslik	Jounieh	Lebanon	1938	Accredited
Lebanese American University	Beirut; Byblos	Lebanon	1924	Accredited
Notre Dame University–Louaize	Zouk Mosbeh	Lebanon	1987	Accredited
Miami University Dolibois European Center	Differdange	Luxembourg	1968	Accredited
Arkansas State University, Campus Querétaro	Querétaro	Mexico	2017	Accredited
Centro de Enseñanza Técnica y Superior	Mexicali	Mexico	1961	Accredited
Monterrey Institute of Technology and Higher Education	Monterrey	Mexico	1943	Accredited
Universidad de las Américas, A.C.	Mexico City	Mexico	1940	Accredited
Universidad de las Américas Puebla	San Andrés Cholula	Mexico	1940	Accredited
University of Monterrey	San Pedro Garza García	Mexico	1969	Accredited
Al Akhawayn University	Ifrane	Morocco	1993	Accredited - NECHE
Keiser University-Latin American Campus	San Marcos	Nicaragua	1993	Accredited
Forman Christian College	Lahore	Pakistan	1864	Unaccredited (Candidate)
Habib University	Karachi	Pakistan	2014	Unaccredited (Candidate)
Florida State University - Panama	Ciudad del Saber	Panama	1957	Accredited
Carnegie Mellon University in Qatar	Doha	Qatar	2004	Accredited
Georgetown University in Qatar	Doha	Qatar	2005	Accredited
Northwestern University in Qatar	Doha	Qatar	2008	Accredited
Texas A&M University at Qatar	Doha	Qatar	2003	Accredited
Virginia Commonwealth University - Qatar (VCUArts Qatar)	Doha	Qatar	1998	Accredited
Weill Cornell Medicine - Qatar	Doha	Qatar	2001	Accredited
Carnegie Mellon University Africa	Kigali	Rwanda	2011	Accredited
Hult International Business School	Singapore	Singapore	2024	Accredited
George Mason University - Korea Campus	Incheon	South Korea	2014	Accredited
State University of New York - Korea	Incheon	South Korea	2012	Accredited
University of Utah - Asia Campus	Incheon	South Korea	2014	Accredited
Saint Louis University Madrid Campus	Madrid	Spain	1967	Accredited
Schiller International University	Madrid	Spain	1970	Accredited
American Graduate School of Business	La Tour-de-Peilz	Switzerland	1991	Unaccredited
EHL Hospitality Business School	Lausanne	Switzerland	1893	Accredited
European Graduate School	Saas-Fee	Switzerland	1994	Unaccredited (Candidate)
Franklin University Switzerland	Lugano	Switzerland	1969	Accredited
Glion Institute of Higher Education	Bulle	Switzerland	1962	Accredited
Les Roches Global Hospitality Education	Crans-Montana	Switzerland	1954	Accredited
Webster University Geneva	Geneva	Switzerland	1978	Accredited
Ming Chuan University	Taipei, Taoyuan, and Kinmen	Taiwan	1957	Accredited
Boğaziçi University	İstanbul	Turkey	1863	Accredited
Abu Dhabi University	Abu Dhabi	United Arab Emirates	2003	Accredited
Ajman University	Ajman	United Arab Emirates	1988	Accredited
American University in Dubai	Dubai	United Arab Emirates	1995	Accredited
American University in the Emirates	Dubai	United Arab Emirates	2006	Accredited
American University of Ras Al Khaimah	Ras Al Khaimah	United Arab Emirates	2009	Accredited
American University of Sharjah	Sharjah	United Arab Emirates	1997	Accredited
Hult International Business School	Dubai	United Arab Emirates	2008	Accredited
New York University Abu Dhabi	Abu Dhabi	United Arab Emirates	2010	Accredited
Rabdan Academy	Abu Dhabi	United Arab Emirates	2013	Accredited
Rochester Institute of Technology of Dubai	Dubai	United Arab Emirates	2008	Accredited
Zayed University	Abu Dhabi and Dubai	United Arab Emirates	1998	Accredited
Hult International Business School	London	United Kingdom	2009	Accredited
Northeastern University – London	London	United Kingdom	2010	Accredited
Richmond American University London	London	United Kingdom	1972	Accredited
Fulbright University Vietnam	Ho Chi Minh City	Vietnam	2016	Unaccredited (Candidate)

== Former American-style colleges and universities outside the United States ==
- American University of Afghanistan, Kabul (2005–2021)
- American University in Bosnia and Herzegovina, Tuzla (2005–2021)
- Webster University Thailand, Bangkok and Cha-am (1999–2021)
- Yale-NUS College, Singapore (2011–2025)

== See also ==
- American College
- American University (disambiguation)
