= List of universities in Jordan =

Universities in Jordan's provinces

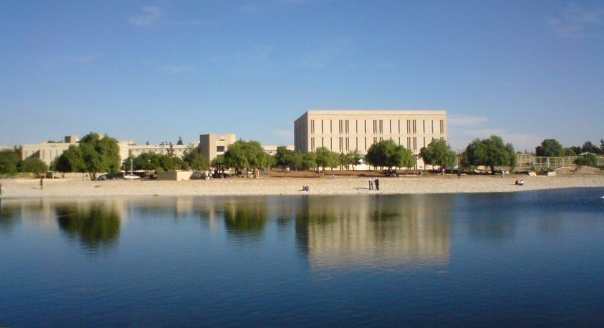
A view of the Jordan University of Science & Technology in Irbid.

This is a list of degree-granting universities and institutions in the Hashemite Kingdom of Jordan sorted alphabetically by the governorate to which each university belongs. Jordan has both private and public universities, many of which are supported by the government of Jordan and their respective provinces. Jordan has a fairly large number of universities for its size. In addition, there are 50 community colleges in Jordan that are not listed here.

== Governorates ==
The Hashemite Kingdom of Jordan is divided into twelve governorates (muhafazah) as follows:

=== Ajloun ===
- Balqa Applied University- Ajloun College
- Ajloun National Private University

=== Amman ===
- Al-Ahliyya Amman University
- Al-Isra University
- Al-Zaytoonah University of Jordan
- Amman Arab University
- Applied Science Private University
- Arab Academy for Banking and Financial Sciences
- Arab Open University
- Columbia University: Amman Branch
- German-Jordanian University: Jabal-Amman Branch
  - German-Jordanian University: Almushaqar campus/Main Campus
- Al Hussein Technical University
- Ibn Sina University for Medical Sciences: Amman-Al Qastal
- Jordan Academy for Maritime Studies
- Jordan Academy of Music
- Jordan Institute of Banking Studies
- Jordan Media Institute
- Luminus Technical University College
- Middle East University
- National University College of Technology
- Petra University
- Philadelphia University
- Princess Sumaya University for Technology
- Queen Noor Civil Aviation Technical College
- The World Islamic Science & Education University (W.I.S.E)
- University of Jordan

=== Aqaba ===
- Aqaba University of Technology (2011)
- Institute of Banking Studies: Aqaba Branch
- Aqaba Campus of the University of Jordan
- Aqaba Medical Sciences University

=== Balqa ===
- Balqa Applied University (Salt)
- Baptism Site International Orthodox University

=== Irbid ===
- Irbid National University
- Jordan University of Science and Technology
- Institute of Banking Studies: Irbid Branch
- Yarmouk University
- Jadara University

=== Jerash ===
- Jerash Private University

=== Kerak ===
- Mutah University (in Mu'tah)
- Balqa Applied University (kerak)

=== Ma'an ===
- Al-Hussein Bin Talal University
- Balqa Applied University- College of Agriculture (in Shoubak)
- Balqa Applied University- College of Ma'an (in Ma'an)

=== Madaba ===
- American University of Madaba (AUM):Madaba Campus

=== Mafraq ===
- Al al-Bayt University

=== Tafilah ===
- Tafila Technical University

=== Zarqa ===
- Hashemite University
- Zarqa Private University

== See also ==
- List of Islamic educational institutions
