= American College =

American College is the name of:

- American College (Brisbane), Woolloongabba, Brisbane, Queensland, Australia
- American College Dublin, Dublin, Ireland
- American College in Madurai, Tamil Nadu, India
- American College of Education, Indianapolis, Indiana, US
- The American College of Financial Services, King of Prussia, Pennsylvania, US
- American College of Holistic Nutrition, the former name of Clayton College of Natural Health, Birmingham, Alabama, US
- American College of Management and Technology, Croatia, part of the Rochester Institute of Technology
- American College of Mersovan, Merzifon, Turkey
- American College of Monaco, Monte Carlo, Monaco
- American College of Norway, Moss, Norway
- American College of Sofia, Sofia, Bulgaria
- American College of the Immaculate Conception, Leuven (French: Louvain), Belgium
- American College Personnel Association (ACPA - College Student Educators International), Washington, District of Columbia, US
- Anatolia College, Thessaloniki, Greece
- Pontifical North American College, originally known as "The American College of the Roman Catholic Church of the United States", Rome, Italy
- American College, a.k.a. Robert College in Istanbul (previously Constantinople), Turkey
- Regent's American College London

== See also ==
- American International College
- American University (disambiguation)
- Higher education in the United States
