= American University (disambiguation) =

American University is a university in Washington D.C., United States.

American University may also refer to:

- American University of Afghanistan
- American University of Antigua College of Medicine
- American University of Armenia
- American University of Baghdad
- American University of Bahrain
- American University of Beirut
- American University in Bosnia and Herzegovina
- American University in Bulgaria
- American University in Cairo
- American University of the Caribbean, Sint Maarten
- American University of the Caribbean (Haiti)
- American University of Central Asia, Bishkek, Kyrgyzstan
- American University in Dubai
- American University of Iraq
- American University in Kosovo, former name of RIT Kosovo, an overseas campus of the Rochester Institute of Technology
- American University of Kuwait, Salmiya, Kuwait
- American University in London
- American University of London
- American University of Madaba
- American University of Malta
- American University of the Middle East, Egaila, Kuwait
- American University (Nicaragua)
- American University of Nigeria
- American University of Paris
- American University of Phnom Penh
- American University of Puerto Rico
- American University of Rome
- American University of Science and Technology, Beirut, Lebanon
- American University of Sharjah
- American University of Technology, Byblos, Lebanon

== See also ==
- American College (disambiguation)
- American International University (disambiguation)
- Allied American University
- American InterContinental University
- American Jewish University
- American National University
- American Public University System
- Arab American University
- Girne American University
- Hellenic American University
- International American University
- Irish American University
- Lebanese American University
- National American University
- Texila American University, Guyana
- Texila American University Zambia
- Higher education in the United States
- List of American institutions of higher education
