= Crispin Maslog =

Media scholar

- Born: Crispin C. Maslog; December 5, 1931 (age 94); Maribojoc, Bohol, Philippine Islands
- Education: UST Faculty of Philosophy and Letters
- Occupation: Professor
- Writing career
- Notable work: Philippine Communication Today (2007)

Crispin Maslog (born December 5, 1931) is a Filipino media scholar, journalist, and professor.

== Education ==
Maslog attended the University of Santo Tomas and finished two undergraduate degrees in journalism (1955) and philosophy (1960). He attained his Master of Arts degree in Journalism and his Doctor of Philosophy degree in Mass Communications from the University of Minnesota in 1962 and 1967 respectively.

== Career ==
Maslog formerly worked with the Agence France-Presse and taught at Silliman University, where he was founder of the university's journalism school. He also taught at the University of the Philippines, Los Baños. He is a founding member of the Asian Media Information and Communication Centre. He is a consultant for the Asian Institute of Journalism and Communication. Maslog is a former visiting professor at the University of North Dakota, Grand Forks, Minnesota State University Moorhead, Nanyang Technological University, and the American College of Norway.

== Select work ==
- 5 Successful Asian Community Newspapers (2007)
- The Metro Manila Press (1994)
- The Rise and Fall of Philippine Community Newspapers (1993)
- Communication, Values, and Society (1992)
- Campus Stylebook: A Guide to Writing & Editing for Popular Publications (1990)
- Philippine Mass Communication: a mini-history (1990)
- The Dragon Slayer of the Countryside (1989)
- Philippine Communication: An Introduction (1988)
- People Power and Communication (1986)
- Philippine Communication Curriculum: How, why & what for
