= International branch campus =

Branch of educational institution

An international branch campus (IBC) is a form of international higher education whereby one or more partnering institutions establishes a physical presence in a foreign location for the purpose of expanding global outreach and student exchange. Generally named for their "home" institution and offering undergraduate and graduate programs, graduating students are conferred degrees from one or all partnering institutions, dependent on the agreement. Instruction most often occurs in properties owned or leased by the foreign institution, sometimes with a local partner, and may also include additional services and facilities to mirror Western universities. IBCs are delivered in many formats and currently exist all over the world. While they have been around in some form since at least the 1930s, they have gained much popularity over the last two decades. As of June 2026, there are 384 international branch campuses worldwide meeting the Cross-Border Education Research Team definition.

== Background ==
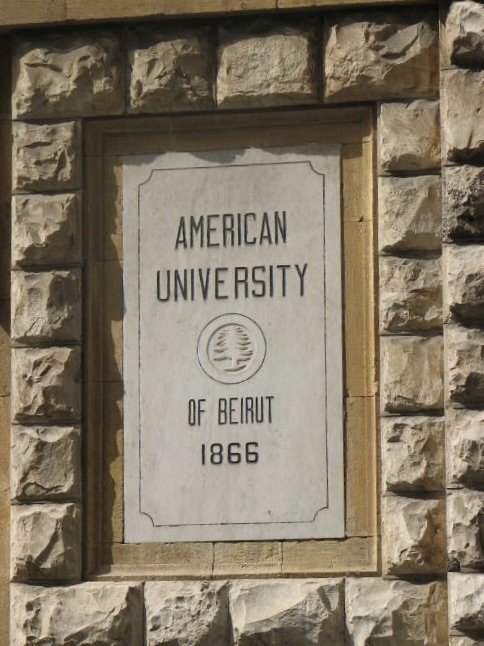
American University of Beirut

While the internationalization of higher education is considered a contemporary phenomenon, it has a variety of historical roots. During the colonial era, the practice of setting up "branch" institutions in foreign countries or sponsoring schools in the colonies was commonplace, serving the most basic purposes characteristic of the period. This practice included institutions established by the British and French in Africa and Asia, by the Dutch in Indonesia, by the Roman Catholic organizations (particularly the Jesuits) in Latin America and the Philippines, and, in the nineteenth century, by American Protestant missionaries. These established colleges grounded in the US model in countries such as Egypt, Turkey and Lebanon, practices from which the American University of Beirut was founded.

Codrington College in Barbados and Fourah Bay College in Sierra Leone, both established on English lines by Anglican missionaries, were affiliated to Durham University in the UK from 1875 to 1965 and from 1876 to 1967 respectively, allowing students there to study for degrees on the same basis as students in England. While students across the British Empire had been able to study for external degrees of the University of London prior to this, four students at Codrington were, in 1877, the first overseas students to gain English degrees after following a residential course. Another early example of international affiliation is the establishment of medical and nursing training at Peking Union Medical College Hospital by Johns Hopkins University in the US in the 1910s. In a broader sense, higher education institutions have long held global orientations, in that they served international students, employed professors from different countries, and, in medieval Europe, functioned chiefly in the common language of Latin.

Close resemblances of the contemporary branch campus model emerged in the early twentieth century. At this time, these campuses functioned primarily to serve US military and civilian personnel in the US-owned Canal Zone. Florida State University, among other institutions, began providing this type of cross-border program as early 1933. In the 1950s, Johns Hopkins University opened a branch campus in Italy, the Bologna Center, which is now considered the oldest established branch campus still in operation, meeting the modern definition of an IBC from 1961. In 1969 the British Institute in Paris, established in 1895 as the Franco-British Guild, became part of the University of London and is considered the oldest established branch campus of a non-US institution still in operation. ESCP Business School established campuses in Germany and the UK in 1973.

The first concentration of branch campuses in a single country was established in Japan during the 1980s for various diplomatic reasons. Wanting to improve the relationship between Japan and the United States, the Japanese government recruited several US universities to establish branch campuses on its soil, of which nearly 30 did in cooperation with Japanese institutions or private companies. Only one of these campuses (Temple University, Japan Campus) remains as of 2024; the rest mostly closing due to inconvenient locations and difficulties in English language instruction. ESMOD, a French fashion university, also established a campus in Tokyo in 1984. ESMOD added campuses in Tunisia in 1988, Norway in 1990 and Indonesia in 1996. The only other non-US IBC established before 1990 was the University of Sheffield International Faculty in Greece in 1989, which transitioned between 2022 and 2024 to become the CITY College, University of York Europe Campus.

International branch campuses began to proliferate in the mid-1990s and further into the twenty-first century. The 1990s saw a wave of diversifying institutions expanding abroad, primarily from Australia, Mexico, Chile, Ireland, Canada, Italy, the UK, and Sweden; to target areas in Africa, Southeast and East Asia, the Middle East and South America. There were approximately 50 IBCs at the end of the '90s boom (not including those in the Japanese bubble), reaching 183 in 2011. Some have seen the development of the IBCs an extraordinary form of privatization in the public sector (largely due to the geographic separation from the state); however, Jason E. Lane and Kevin Kinser have argued that the extent of an IBCs privatization should also be assessed in relation to fulfilling public purposes in the host country. As of June 2026, there were 384 international branch campuses worldwide meeting the Cross-Border Education Research Team definition.

=== Globalization and higher education ===
The growth of branch campuses and internationalizing activities in the 1990s can be largely attributed to the forces of globalization. Though there were plenty of opponents against the idea that higher education should be subject to the types of free trade agreements that were applied toward commercial goods and services within the global economy, counterarguments offer the perspective that trade had already been present in higher education for some time, evidenced in the increasing numbers of students seeking education overseas. In fact, this trade was seen in many ways as a tool for international relations and soft power. International branch campuses may expand access to learning opportunities to students who are unable to go overseas to earn a degree.

One development which was of particular significance to the globalization of education was the finalization of the Uruguay round of trade talks in 1994, from which the World Trade Organization, the body that monitors and promotes free trade, was formed. The Uruguay round also saw the creation of new trade agreements, such as the General Agreement on Trade in Services and Trade-Related Aspects of Intellectual Property Rights. The significance of these trade agreements was that they expanded the notion of trading in goods to include trading in services.

== Geographic locations ==
Most international branch campuses are located throughout Asia and the Middle East. IBCs have developed in dense pockets in regions such as the United Arab Emirates, Qatar, Saudi Arabia, Singapore and Malaysia. Both the United Arab Emirates and Qatar have transformed themselves as educational hubs (a collection of campuses from multiple institutions in a common space, creating educational 'hubs', 'cities,' or 'parks'), with Saudi Arabia and Malaysia following closely behind. These academic reforms are mostly market-driven; approximately two-thirds of the new universities in the Arab Middle East are private and nearly half are branches of Western institutions, mostly from the United States, and others from Australia and the United Kingdom.

Many of the countries with the most IBCs (United Arab Emirates, Qatar, China, Malaysia and Singapore) have struggled with the problem of brain drain. The logic of hosting a foreign institution's branch campus is to prevent local students from actually studying abroad by luring them to stay by receiving a foreign degree at home and at a considerably lower cost. Hosting a foreign branch campus can also enhance links with industry, as in some cases programs offered at the campus are aligned by the government to reflect the nation's industry needs; in other cases, such as typically in the Arab Middle East, IBCs help expedite the process of transitioning from an oil economy to a knowledge economy.

== List of the institutions ==
Just over a quarter of the IBCs in operation as of June 2026 are from American institutions, with the United Kingdom, Russia and France also accounting for over 10 per cent each. For many institutions, the establishment of a branch campus abroad is an opportunity to improve international relationships, ability to attract foreign talent, increase prestige and tuition revenue, and expand opportunities for external funding.

=== India ===
India has had a variety of efforts to allow for the importing of international branch campuses. The National Education Policy 2020 set the foundation for subsequent regulatory guidelines for establishing IBCs. The policy set an explicit goal of using IBCs as a means for advancing Prime Minister Narendra Modi's goal of positioning India as a Vishwa Guru (world teacher). Deakin University GIFT City Campus was the first international branch campus established in India in 2024, in Gujarat International Finance Tec-City (GIFT City). The University of Southampton was the first British institution to set up an international branch campus in India. For the 2026–27 academic year, 13 foreign universities are admitting students to a total of 91 academic programs, with average annual tuition fees of approximately ₹13.3 lakh (US$13,800) for undergraduate programs and ₹17.2 lakh (US$17,900) for postgraduate programs. The combined intake for 2026–27 is estimated at fewer than 3,000 students, with actual enrolment expected to be less than half of the available intake. Relatively high annual tuition fees for Indian families and students along with high expectations regarding career outcomes and extent of international learning are emerging as some of the initial challenges for these campuses. The tuition pricing of a global degree at these international campuses is priced at a discount to studying abroad, but at a premium to Tier-1 private universities. The debate about the extent to which these IBCs can replace study abroad are also emerging.

=== Malaysia ===
Development of international branch campuses in Malaysia reflects the country's pursuit of becoming a global knowledge hub. Two major IBC initiatives in Malaysia include EduCity in Iskandar and Kuala Lumpur Education City (KLEC). Built in an economic free-zone, EduCity is sponsored by the government-backed investment organization, Iskandar Investment Bhd (IIB), whose strategic goals include recruiting regional students, producing a skilled workforce that supports foreign companies in the free-zones of Iskandar. KLEC, which is located in the Klang Valley of Kuala Lumpur, is overseen by the private investment firm KLEC Ventures, which seeks to attract commercial investment to Malaysia and touts its environmentally friendly and energy efficient nature. These institutions exemplify Malaysia's recent shift from sending students abroad to receiving students from abroad.

Many of these foreign educational institutions in Malaysia are branch campuses. A branch can be seen as an 'offshore campus' of the foreign university, which offers identical courses and awards as the main campus. Local and international students can acquire these identical foreign qualifications in Malaysia at a lower fee, with a local Asian experience. All officially recognized international branch campuses are registered at the Ministry of Higher Education of Malaysia as private universities.

Officially recognized international branch campuses in Malaysia include:

- UOW Malaysia (1983)
- Royal College of Surgeons In Ireland and University College Dublin Malaysia Campus (1996)
- Monash University Malaysia (1998)
- Curtin University Malaysia (1999)
- Swinburne University of Technology Sarawak Campus (2000)
- University of Nottingham Malaysia (2000)
- Newcastle University Medicine Malaysia (2011)
- University of Southampton Malaysia (2012)
- Heriot-Watt University Malaysia (2014)
- University of Reading Malaysia (2015)
- Xiamen University Malaysia (2016)
- University of Tsukuba Malaysia (2024)

=== Qatar ===
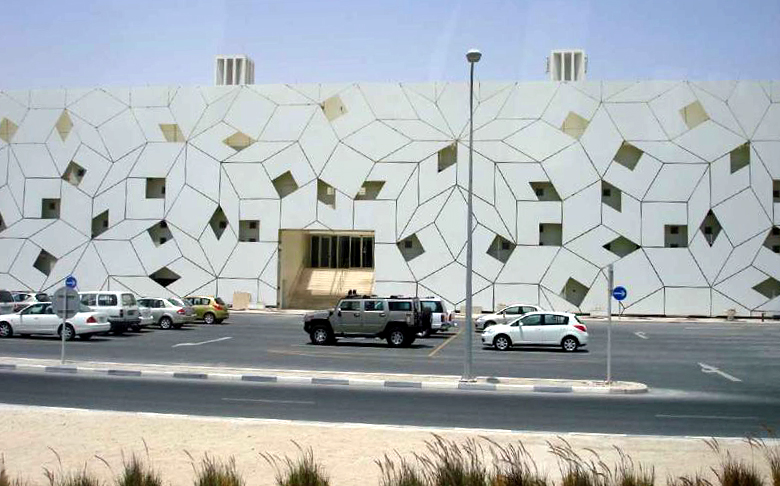
LAS Building at Education City The Liberal Arts and Science (LAS) building on the Education City campus in Doha, Qatar, where classes used to be held for both Georgetown University School of Foreign Service in Qatar and for Texas A&M University at Qatar.

Qatar's Education City was developed to attract top programs, primarily from the United States in order to enhance the educational offerings in the country. While IBCs in Education City remain private institutions, the construction of Education City was funded through the royal family's Qatar Foundation for Education, Science and Community Development. As of 2022, there are seven international universities (six American, one French) with programs available at IBCs in the Education City, in addition to one Qatari university. The eight institutions in Education City include:

- Virginia Commonwealth University
- Weill Cornell Medical College
- Texas A&M University
- Carnegie Mellon
- Georgetown University School of Foreign Service
- Northwestern University
- Hautes Etudes Commerciales de (HEC) Paris
- Hamad Bin Khalifa University

=== United Arab Emirates ===
The UAE has set aggressive goals to make it a destination for higher education destination. Free zones have been established in individual Emirates in which organizations operating from within are exempt from federal regulation. These zones were originally intended for foreign investment from corporations and have expanded to house education hubs—or education cities. IBCs in free zones are generally financially independent and expected to cover their own costs. Fifty of these IBCs are located across four different free zones in Dubai, each operating as its own complex. Established by real estate master developer TECOM Investments in 2003 to complement other business parks, Dubai Knowledge Village (DKV) contains 15 IBCs and 150 training institutions and learning centers. DKV was expanded in 2007 to Dubai International Academic City (DIAC), which consists of 40 branch campuses of foreign universities. IBCs within the free zones are regulated by the Dubai Knowledge and Human Development Authority. There are a number of private institutions outside the UAE's free zones. The Commission for Academic Accreditation (CAA), the federal accrediting body modeled after agencies in the United States, regulates these institutions. Foreign education providers are expected to obey and maintain the policies and regulations of their home campus.

== Research productivity ==
Most IBCs focus initially on providing education; however, some IBCs have evidenced interest and commitment to engaging in research. Hans Pohl and Jason E. Lane developed a methodology using SciVal data to determine the research productivity of faculty/researchers at IBCs. Their research demonstrated that IBCs in countries such as Qatar, UAE, and Malaysia contribute a significant portion of those nation's overall research productivity. However, in an analysis of research-producing universities in Abu Dhabi, their research suggested that IBCs may not necessarily have greater impact than other forms of educational investment when it comes to overall research productivity.

== Cross-Border Education Research Team ==
The Cross-Border Education Research Team (C-BERT) was founded in 2010 by Professors Jason Lane and Kevin Kinser, then at the State University of New York at Albany, to track and study the development of international branch campuses. C-BERT maintains a publicly accessible list of IBCs operating around the world, using the definition:

An entity that is owned, at least in part, by a foreign higher education provider; operated in the name of the foreign education provider; and provides an entire academic program, substantially on site, leading to a degree awarded by the foreign education provider.

The largest 'exporter' countries on the C-BERT listing, as of June 2026, are the United States (99 campuses), the United Kingdom (53), Russia (41), France (39) and Australia (24), while the largest 'importer' countries are China (51 campuses), United Arab Emirates (39), Uzbekistan (17), Malaysia (16) and Singapore (16). The list contains a total of 384 active campuses.

== Typology ==
Lane and Kinser identified five models of ownership for international branch campuses in 2012, based on a survey of 180 IBCs that elicited 50 responses:

1. Wholly owned (28%) – This was found to be the most common firm of ownership, despite having the highest financial risk associated with it, possibly because it also provides stability and helps guarantee independence.
2. Government partners (22%) – Arrangements where the host country's local or national government owns the campus were most common in places where the government saw IBCs as o part of their economic development strategy. Examples include Qatar's Education City.
3. Private investors (20%) – Partnerships with local investors or property developers, who then either receive a status in the revenues or use the presence of the IBC to help sell other properties in the area.
4. Renting (18%) – These are often within developments such as the Dubai Knowledge Village or the Dubai International Academic City, both purpose-built for this purpose with multiple institutions renting similar spaces, creating a "shopping mall" effect. Renting facilities can also be a transitional solution until a more permanent owned campus is secured and constructed.
5. Academic partners (12%) – Based within the campus of a partner institution but offering stand-alone qualifications delivered solely by the branch campus rather than joint degrees or dual degrees delivered through an academic partnership.

In 2007, Line Verbik of the Observatory on Borderless Higher Education investigated the 80 then-existing IBCs, identifying funding models for 68 of these and finding that these fell into three categories:

1. Fully funded by the institution (37%) – This was the most common funding model found, even though it places the risk on the home institution, possibly because it also frees the hole institution from obligations to partners. However, many of the IBCs with this model are among the older, more established campuses or are relatively small-scale, offering limited programs, such as business-related qualifications.
2. External funding (35%) – The two major sources of external funding are host nation governments and private companies. This model was rapidly growing at the time of the survey, with 70% of externally-funded IBCs been founded since 2000. A downside of external funding is that funders may wish to influence operations and, when being comes from the private sector, will expect a return on their investment.
3. Facilities provided (28%) – an even newer model, with all but one IBC in this category established within six years of the survey, where the host county or a private company provides facilities to lease or take over, reducing the startup funds needed. This can, however, leave costs such as rent outside of the control of the home institution and may require IBCs to operate within rules established by the company that owns the site. This model was most common in economically advanced countries, such as the Gulf states, where there is wide availability of public and private funding.

== Criticisms ==
Though a variety of studies concerning the student experience and satisfaction in IBCs have found that most students react to their branch campuses similarly to their peers at the home institutions, criticism of IBCs abound. Most prominent among these concerns are those that relate to attracting and retaining host campus faculty, misalignment between home and branch campus, replicating diversity and quality of the student body, mirroring forms of cultural imperialism, lack of data to drive decision-making, organizational culture, and the ability of IBCs to adapt to the "new" local context.

== See also ==
- List of American universities and colleges outside the United States
