= Solve Education =

Solve Education!
- Solve Education Foundation
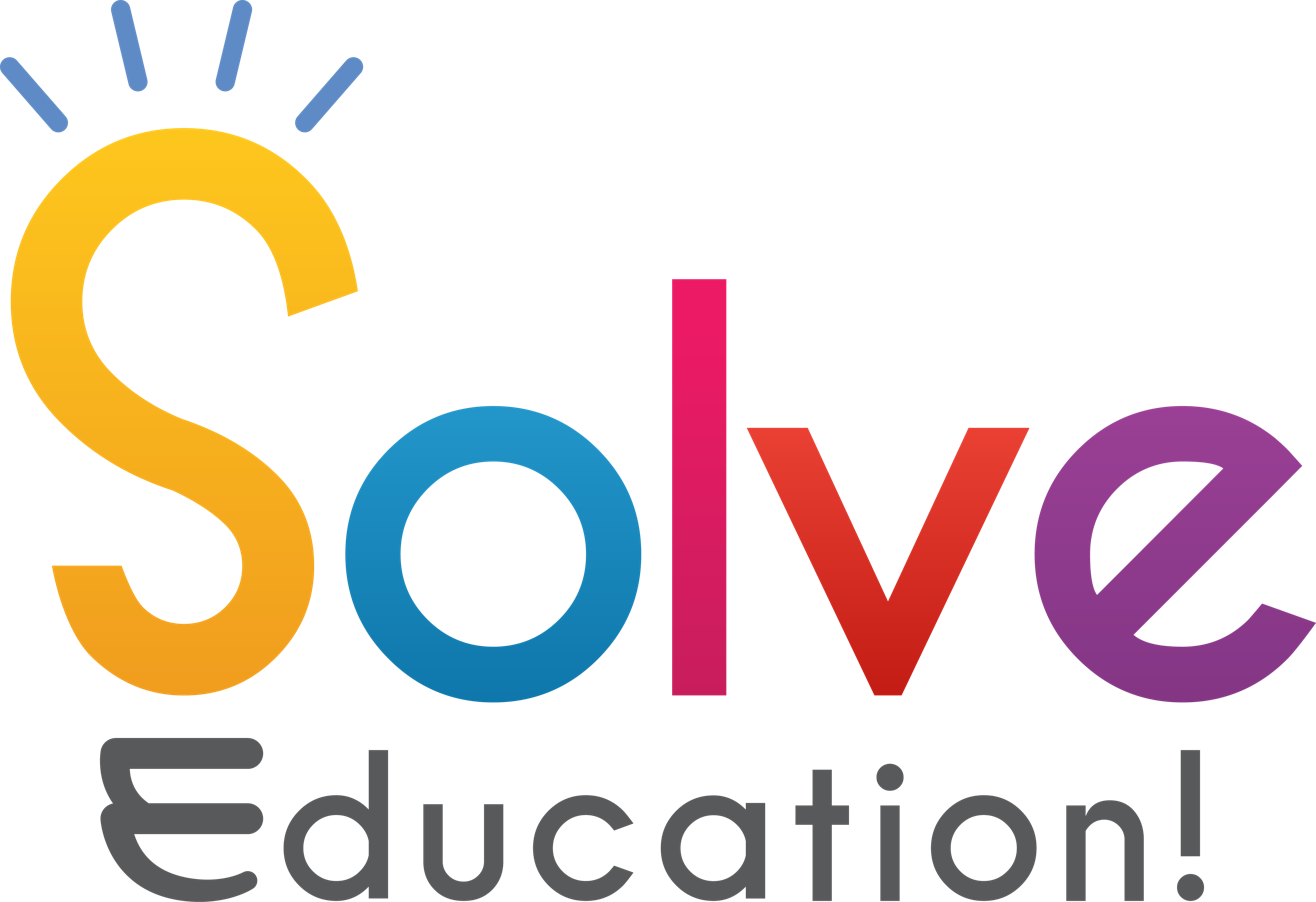
- Abbreviation: SE!
- Formation: 2015
- Founders: Ong Peng Tsin; Janine Teo
- Type: Non-profit
- Headquarters: Singapore
- Region served: Worldwide
- Key people: Ong Peng Tsin (Chairman); Janine Teo (CEO); Talitha Amalia (COO)
- Website: solveeducation.org

Solve Education! (SE!) is a social enterprise and registered non-profit organization founded in 2015 by Ong Peng Tsin and Janine Teo. It is headquartered in Singapore, and it also has offices in Indonesia and United States

== History ==
Solve Education! was founded in December 2015 after Peng Tsin Ong attended the Africa Innovation Summit in Cape Verde in 2014. At the end of the summit, he engaged stakeholders from Africa on the ideal educational intervention for narrowing the gap of education inequalities to help produce knowledge workers for a knowledge economy.

In 2017, Solve Education! launched its first learning platform, Dawn of Civilization, in Indonesia.

== Services ==
- Dawn of Civilization is a city-building game based on various subjects, and containing other mini-games. The game was launched in 2017 and is designed to be operated on low-end mobile devices, to increase access to low-income families.
- Ed the Learning Bot is an AI-based chatbot used by Solve Education! on Telegram. The bot has been launched in Nigeria and was reviewed by the Nigerian Ministry of Education, which acknowledged its role to improve the literacy of youth. The bot is also widely used in Indonesia, Malaysia, and Singapore, and other parts of Southeast Asia, with multiple funders including Lenovo.
- Game for Charity is a point-based program which was introduced during the COVID-19 pandemic. By completing learning modules, students can earn points which they can later exchange for food packages. Solve Education! worked with various organizations, including the Nusantra Innovation Forum, Putera Sampoerna Foundation, and the government of East Java to gamify the pandemic-safety education package for underserved children in Indonesia.
- In partnership with Badan Kependudukan dan Keluarga Berencana Nasional (BKKBN), a government body operating under the Indonesian Ministry of Health, Solve Education! launched a digital comic book which addresses family planning issues in Indonesia.
