= Putera Sampoerna =

Indonesian businessman

- Born: 13 October 1947 (age 78); Schiedam, Netherlands
- Citizenship: Indonesia
- Occupation: Businessman
- Spouse: Katie (Kathleen Chow Liem)
- Children: 4

Putera Sampoerna (born 13 October 1947) is an Indonesian businessman. As of 2025, he had an estimated net worth of US$2.5 billion.

Putera Sampoerna gained his wealth as heir to the Sampoerna cigarette company (PT HM Sampoerna Tbk.) Putera was educated abroad from an early age; starting from the Diocesan Boys' School in Hong Kong, the Carey Baptist Grammar School in Melbourne and finally at the University of Houston in Texas. He led Sampoerna from 1978 until 2000, when he was replaced by his son Michael Sampoerna. In 2005 Putera, together with the rest of his family sold their stake in Sampoerna to Philip Morris International for USD 5 billion.

After the sale of Sampoerna, Putera and his family founded investment company Sampoerna Strategic, currently led by his son Michael. Sampoerna Strategic has businesses in the telecommunications, agriculture (palm oil plantations), forestry, and the microfinance industry. Putera and his family also run the Putera Sampoerna Foundation.
