= American University of Madaba =

Private university in Madaba, Jordan

Coordinates: 31°39′40″N 35°48′00″E

- الجامعة الاميركية في مادبا
- Other names: AUM
- Type: private university (Catholic)
- Established: 2011
- Affiliations: Latin Patriarchate of Jerusalem, AArU American universities.
- Chairman: Eng. Azzam Shweihat
- President: Prof. Adi Arida
- Location: Madaba, Jordan
- Campus: Urban
- Website: aum.edu.jo

The American University of Madaba (Arabic: الجامعة الاميركية في مادبا) is a non-profit university located in Madaba, Jordan. It opened in October 2011, and expects to eventually accommodate 8,000 students once the campus is completed. The standards of teaching qualifications and experience satisfy the accreditation requirements of the Higher Education Accreditation Commission (HEAC) in Jordan.

The university is established by the Latin Patriarchate in Jerusalem which received the license from the Higher Education Council of Jordan in 2005 under the name of the University of Madaba. On 9 May 2009, Pope Benedict XVI laid the cornerstone of the university, whose name was later changed to become the American University of Madaba (AUM) as of 29 May 2011. The official inauguration took place on 30 May 2013 in the presence of the King of Jordan Abdullah II and of the Pope's representative, Cardinal Leonardo Sandri.

== See also ==
- Catholic Church
- List of universities in Jordan
- American University of Sharjah (AUS)
- American University of Beirut (AUB)
- American University of Iraq - Sulaimani (AUI)
- American University in Dubai (AUD)
- American University (disambiguation) for a list of similarly named institutions
