= Romanization of Khmer =

Representation of the Khmer language in Latin alphabets

The romanization of Khmer is a representation of the Khmer (Cambodian) language using letters of the Latin alphabet. This is most commonly done with Khmer proper nouns, such as names of people and geographical names, as in a gazetteer. In its modern digital form, romanized Khmer is widely known among younger Cambodians as "Sing Khmer" or "Signe Khmer", according to sociolinguistic research conducted by Joshua Wilwohl at the American University of Phnom Penh. Wilwohl outlines that university students frequently utilize these hybrid translanguaging varieties across digital platforms like Telegram to actively construct and negotiate a modern identity.

== Romanization systems for Khmer ==
Cambodian geographical names are often romanized with a transliteration system, where representations in the Khmer script are mapped regularly to representations in the Latin alphabet (sometimes with some additional diacritics). The results do not always reflect standard Khmer pronunciation, as no special treatment is given to unpronounced letters and irregular pronunciations, although the two registers of Khmer vowel symbols are often taken into account.

When transcription is used, words are romanized based on their pronunciation. However, pronunciation of Khmer can vary by speaker and region. Roman transcription of Khmer is often done ad hoc on Internet forums and chatrooms, the results sometimes being referred to as Khmenglish or Khmerlish. These ad hoc romanizations are usually based on English pronunciations of letters, although they may also be influenced by Khmer spelling (as with the use of s rather than h to represent a final aspirate).

Since some sounds can be represented by more than one symbol in Khmer orthography, it is not generally possible to recover the original Khmer spelling from a pronunciation-based Roman transcription. Even transliteration systems often do not preserve all of the distinctions made in the Khmer script.

Some of the more commonly used romanization systems for Khmer are listed below. For full details of the various systems, see the links given in the External Links section.

=== BGN/PCGN ===
A system used by the United States Board on Geographic Names and the Permanent Committee on Geographical Names for British Official Use, published in 1962, with minor modifications in 1971, and approved by the UN as a standard romanization system for Khmer in 1972. It was based on and modified from the 1959 Service Géographique Khmer (SGK) system.

=== UNGEGN ===
The Khmer romanization scheme published by the United Nations Group of Experts on Geographical Names is based on the BGN/PCGN system, described above. It is used for Cambodian geographical names in some recent maps and gazetteers, although the Geographic Department's modified system (see below) has come into use in the country since 1995. Correspondences in the UNGEGN system are detailed in the Khmer alphasyllabary article.

=== Geographic Department ===
The Geographic Department of the Cambodian Ministry of Land Management and Urban Planning has developed a modified version of the UNGEGN system, originally put forward in 1995, and used in the second edition of the Gazetteer of Cambodia in 1996. Further modifications were made in 1997, and the system continues to be used in Cambodia.

The main change made in this system compared with the UNGEGN system is that diacritics on vowels are omitted. Some of the vowels are also represented using different letter combinations.

=== ALA-LC Romanization Tables ===
This system (also called Transliteration System for Khmer Script), from the American Library Association and Library of Congress, romanizes Khmer words using the original Indic values of the Khmer letters, which are often different from their modern values. This can obscure the modern Khmer pronunciation, but the system has the advantage of relative simplicity, and facilitates the etymological reconstruction of Sanskrit and Pali loanwords whose pronunciation may be different in modern Khmer. The system is a modification of that proposed by Lewitz (1969), and was developed by Franklin Huffman of Cornell University and Edwin Bonsack of the Library of Congress for the library cataloguing of publications in Khmer.

== Example words written in each romanization system ==
English	Khmer	Pronunciation	Romanization		
English	Khmer	Pronunciation	UNGEGN (or BGN/PCGN)	Geographic Department	ALA-LC
Khmer script	អក្សរខ្មែរ	[ʔak.sɑː kʰmae]	'âksâr khmêr	'aksar khmaer	ʿʹaksar khmaer
Cambodia	កម្ពុជា	[kam.pu.ciə]	Kâmpŭchéa	Kampuchea	Kambujā
centre	មណ្ឌល	[mɔn.ɗɔl], [mŏən.ɗɔl]	môndôl	mondol	maṇḍal
brightness	ពន្លឺ	[pɔn.lɨː]	pônlœ	ponlueu	banlȳ
peace	សន្តិភាព	[sɑn.te.pʰiəp]	sântĕphéap	santepheap	santibhāb
belief	ជំនឿ	[cum.nɨə]	chumnœă	chumnoea	jaṃnẏa
to go	ទៅ	[təw]	tŏu	tov	dau

== Tables of romanization systems ==
This chart shows in full the three main systems for the romanization of Khmer: UNGEGN (or BGN/PCGN), Geographic Department and ALA-LC:

=== Consonants ===
1st series 2nd series (Note: Khmer consonants belong to two classes that dictate the value of dependent vowels.)

Khmer			UNGEGN (or BGN/PCGN)	Geographic Department	ALA-LC
Full form	Subscript form	IPA	UNGEGN (or BGN/PCGN)	Geographic Department	ALA-LC
ក	្ក	[k]	ka	ka	k
ខ	្ខ	[kʰ]	kha	kha	kh
គ	្គ	[k]	ga	go	g
ឃ	្ឃ	[kʰ]	gha	gho	gh
ង	្ង	[ŋ]	ṅa	ṅo	ng
ច	្ច	[c]	ca	ca	c
ឆ	្ឆ	[cʰ]	cha	cha	ch
ជ	្ជ	[c]	ja	jo	j
ឈ	្ឈ	[cʰ]	jha	jho	jh
ញ	្ញ	[ɲ]	ña	ño	ñ
ដ	្ដ	[ɗ]	ța	ța	ṭ
ឋ	្ឋ	[tʰ]	țha	țha	ṭh
ឌ	្ឌ	[ɗ]	ḍa	do	ḍ
ឍ	្ឍ	[tʰ]	ḍha	ḍho	ḍh
ណ	្ណ	[n]	ṇa	ṇa	ṇ
ត	្ត	[t]	ta	ta	t
ថ	្ថ	[tʰ]	tha	tha	th
ទ	្ទ	[t]	da	do	d
ធ	្ធ	[tʰ]	dha	dho	dh
ន	្ន	[n]	na	no	n
ប	្ប	[ɓ], [p]	pa	pa, ba (Note: When accompanied by a subscript form, it is romanized as p in the 1st series, although the Khmer diacritical mark ៉ is generally omitted: ប្លែង → plaeng, ប្អូន → p'oun, ប្រាប់ → prab.)	p
ផ	្ផ	[pʰ]	pha	pha	ph
ព	្ព	[p]	ba	bo, po	b
ភ	្ភ	[pʰ]	bha	bho	bh
ម	្ម	[m]	ma	mo	m
យ	្យ	[j]	ya	yo	y
រ	្រ	[r]	ra	ro	r
ល	្ល	[l]	la	lo	l
វ	្វ	[ʋ]	va	vo	v
ឝ	្ឝ	[s]	śa	sha	ś
ឞ	្ឞ	[s]	ṣa	sha	ṣ
ស	្ស	[s]	sa	sa	s
ហ	្ហ	[h]	ha	ha	h
ឡ	―	[l]	ḷa	la	ḷ
អ	្អ	[ʔ]	A	A	A

=== Dependent vowels ===
Khmer	UNGEGN (or BGN/PCGN)		Geographic Department		ALA-LC
Khmer	A-series	O-series	A-series	O-series	A-series
◌◌	â	ô	a	o	a
◌់	á	ó	a	o	á
ា	a	éa	a	ea	ā
ា់, ័◌	ă	eă, oă	a	ea, oa	â
ៈ	ă	eă	ak	eak	à
័យ	ăy	oăy	ai	ey	ăy
ិ	ĕ	ĭ	e	i	i
ី	ei	i	ei	i	ī
ឹ	œ̆	œ̆	oe	ue	ẏ
ឺ	œ	œ	eu	ueu	ȳ
ុ	ŏ	ŭ	o	u	u
ូ	o	u	ou	u	ū
ួ	uŏ	uŏ	uo	uo	ua
ើ	aeu	eu	aeu	eu	oe
ឿ	œă	œă	oea	oea	ẏa
ៀ	iĕ	iĕ	ie	ie	ia
េ	é	é	e	e	e
ែ	ê	ê	ae	eae	ae
ៃ	ai	ey	ai	ey	ai
ោ	aô	oŭ	ao	ou	o
ៅ	au	ŏu	au	ov	au
ុំ	om	ŭm	om	um	uṃ
ំ	âm	um	am	um	aṃ
ាំ	ăm	ŏâm	am	oam	āṃ
ាំង	ăng	eăng	ang	eang	āṃng
ះ	ăh	eăh	ah	eah	aḥ
ិះ	ĕh	ĭh	eh	is	iḥ
ឹះ	œ̆h	œ̆h	oeh	ueh	ẏḥ
ុះ	ŏh	ŭh	oh	uh	uḥ
េះ	éh	éh	eh	eh	eḥ
ើះ	aeuh	euh	aeuh	euh	oeḥ
ែះ	êh	êh	aeh	eaeh	aeḥ
ោះ	aôh	ŏăh	aoh	uoh	oaḥ

=== Independent vowels ===
Khmer	UNGEGN (or BGN/PCGN)	Geographic Department	ALA-LC
អ	â	a	a
អា	a	a	ā
ឥ	ĕ	e	i
ឦ	ei	ei	ī
ឧ	ŏ, ŭ	o, u	u
ឩ	o, u	ou, u	ū
ឪ	âu	au	ýu
ឫ	rœ̆	rue	ṛ
ឬ	rœ	rueu	ṝ
ឭ	lœ̆	lue	ḷ
ឮ	lœ	lueu	ḹ
ឯ	ê	ae	ae
ឰ	ai	ai	ai
ឱ, ឲ	aô	ao	o
ឳ	au	au	au

== International Phonetic Alphabet transcription ==
Various authors have used systems based on the International Phonetic Alphabet (IPA) to transcribe Khmer. One such system is used in the books of Franklin E. Huffman and others; a more recent scheme is that used in J.M. Filippi's 2004 textbook Everyday Khmer or Khmer au quotidien. These systems differ in certain respects: for example, Huffman's uses doubling of vowel symbols to indicate long vowels, whereas Filippi's uses the IPA triangular colon vowel length symbol.

== External links to romanization tables ==
- BGN/PCGN (PDF - 334.49kb)
- UNGEGN (PDF - 166kb)
- Geographic Department (PDF)
- ALA-LC (PDF - 1,064kb)
