= American University in the Emirates =

Private university in Dubai

- الجامعة الأمريكية في الإمارات
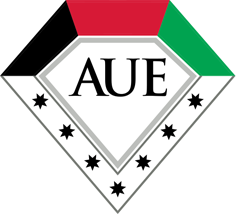
- Motto: Nothing is Impossible
- Type: Private university
- Established: 2006
- Chairman: Major Gen. Ahmed Nasser Al-Raisi
- President: Muthanna G. Abdul Razzaq
- Provost: William Cornwell
- Location: Block 6 & 7, International Academic City, Dubai, United Arab Emirates; 25.123000°N 55.411164°E
- Website: www.aue.ae

The American University in the Emirates (AUE) is a private university in Dubai International Academic City in the United Arab Emirates. The university was founded in 2006.

== Campus ==
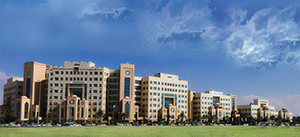
AUE history

AUE is located at the Dubai International Academic City. The American University in the Emirates is located at Block 6 & 7. Dubai International Academic City.

== Academics ==
The AUE offers academic programs at the undergraduate and graduate levels. In addition to these, the university offers language courses for TOEFL, IELTS, ELI and other professional training programs for the business world.

=== Colleges ===
There are seven colleges offering bachelor's and master's degrees:

- College of Business Administration
- College of Media and Mass Communications
- College of Security and Global Studies
- College of Computer Information Technology
- College of Design
- College of Law
- College of Education

=== Undergraduate programs ===
The university undergraduate programs through seven colleges. The College of Educations provides academic services for all other colleges by offering general education courses.

=== Graduate programs ===
In addition to undergraduate programs, the university offers ten master's degree programs.

=== Institutions and centers ===
Besides the core colleges, AUE offers a number of language courses and other professional training programs through its five institutes and centers to address the needs of the country and the region:

- Language Learning Institute
- Ryada
- Technology Incubation Center
- Counseling and Disability Office
- Center for Educational Technology

=== Accreditation and approvals ===
AUE is an approved university by the UAE Ministry of Higher Education and Scientific Research and is licensed by the Commission for Academic Accreditation to offer various undergraduate as well as graduate programs where students can earn bachelor's and master's degrees. The Bachelor of Computer Science in the College of Computer Information Technology is accredited by the Computing Accreditation Commission of ABET:

== See also ==
- American University (disambiguation) for a list of similarly named institutions
- Cairo International Model United Nations
- American University of Sharjah (AUS)
- American University of Beirut (AUB)
- American University of Iraq - Sulaimani (AUI)
- American University in Dubai (AUD)
