= American University in London =

Accredited University

- Type: Closed
- Established: 1984
- Location: Seven Sisters Road, London, England; 51°33′37.6″N 0°6′53.8″W
- Website: www.aul.edu

The American University in London (AUL) was an accredited university in the United Kingdom before being suspended in April 2007. It was located in Seven Sisters Road in London.

The AUL's business education programs had been accredited by the International Assembly for Collegiate Business Education (IACBE), but this accreditation was suspended in April 2007. The IACBE identified need for improvement in the areas of Outcomes Assessment, Strategic Planning, Financial Resources, External Oversight, and Business and Industry Linkages.

AUL had been in partnership with the Geneva Business School.

== See also ==
- American University (disambiguation) for a list of similarly named institutions
- AUC Press
