= Jordan Institute of Banking Studies =

- المعهد الأردني للدراسات المصرفية
- Established: 1971
- Founders: Central Bank of Jordan
- Chairman: Dr. Adel Al Sharkas
- Director: Dr. Riyad Al Hindawi
- Location: Amman, Jordan
- Nickname: IBS
- Website: http://www.ibs.edu.jo

Jordan Institute of Banking Studies is a public university located in Amman, Jordan. Established in 1971 by Central Bank of Jordan to present a group of academic programs and training activities.
