= American College (Brisbane) =

Australian vocational education and training provider

Coordinates: 27.493568°S 153.041787°E

- Motto: Empowering aspiring minds
- Type: Private institute
- Established: 2009
- Director: Dr. Bernard Malik
- Location: 180 Logan Road, Woolloongabba, Brisbane, Queensland, Australia
- Website: www.americancollege.edu.au

The American College (Brisbane) is a private institution located in Woolloongabba, Brisbane, Australia.

== History ==
American College (Brisbane) was initially inaugurated in 2009 by Dr. Bruce Flegg and Mark Ryan. Current Campus was inaugurated in 2012 by Oscar Fernandes, James Marape Papua New Guinea and Mark Stewart.

== Campus ==
American College (Brisbane) has a campus in Brisbane with ultra short throw projectors, computer library with state of the art training rooms for presentation, audio-visual and video conferencing along with student lounges.
