= Putera Sampoerna Foundation =

Non-government organization focused on education

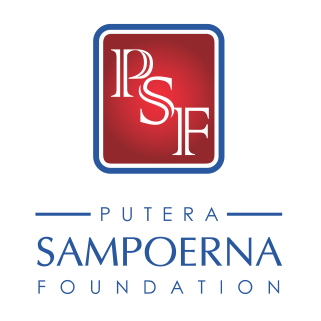
- Formation: 2001
- Founder: Putera Sampoerna
- Type: Charity
- Location: Sampoerna Strategic Square North Tower Lantai 27, Jl. Jend. Sudirman Kav. 45, Jakarta, Indonesia
- Website: www.sampoernafoundation.org

Putera Sampoerna Foundation (PSF) is a social business institution in Indonesia, founded by tobacco heir Putera Sampoerna. PSF is a consultant for, and operator of, corporate social responsibility programs. The Foundation has 4 focuses of influence: ""quality education for high-achieving, but underprivileged students, job creation through entrepreneurship development programs, public enlightenment through the empowerment of women, and the distribution of aid and relief programs for compassionate and disaster relief."

== History ==
In 2001, tobacco heir Putera Sampoerna established the Putera Sampoerna Foundation (PSF). PSF is chaired by Michelle Sampoerna.

As of a 2012 press release, PSF has disbursed more than 34,600 scholarships, organized workshops for more than 19,000 teachers and headmasters, and adopted 23 public schools and 5 Islamic elementary schools (madrasah).

Putera Sampoerna Foundation established Sampoerna Academy (an international boarding high school), the Sampoerna School of Education, and the Sampoerna School of Business.

Ethical concerns have been raised about the foundation for its ties to the tobacco industry. The Foundation receives charity funds from Philip Morris International, which owns Sampoerna.

== Business units ==
PSF has several business units: Koperasi Siswa Bangsa, Sampoerna Academies, School Development Outreach, Sahabat Wanita, Bait Al-Kamil, and MEKAR. The largest unit, constituting roughly one-half of all foundation personnel, is the foundation's university entitled Universitas Siswa Bangsa Internasional.
