= National University College of Technology (Jordan) =

- الكلية الجامعية الوطنية للتكنولوجيا
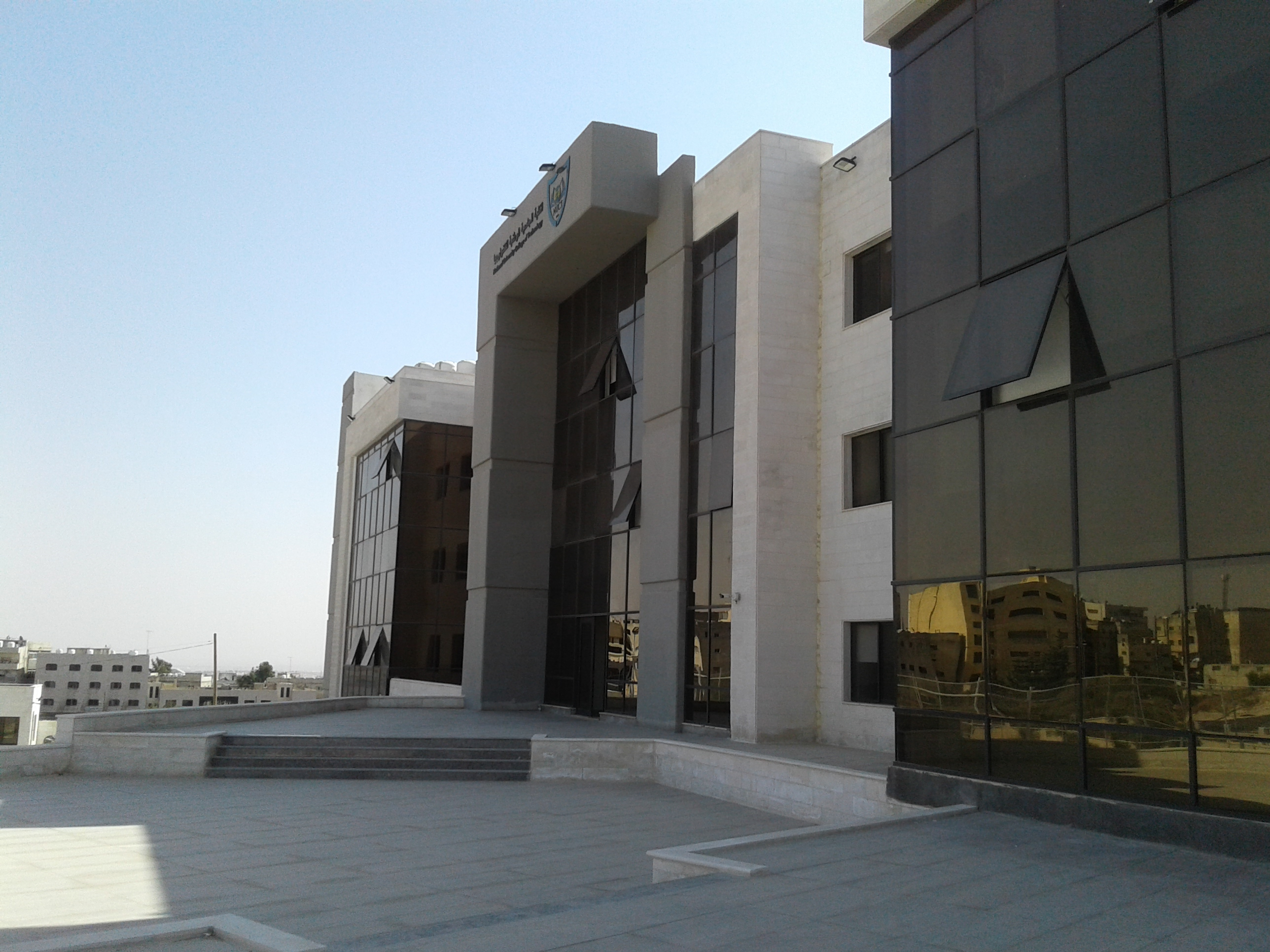
- Type: Private
- Established: 2020
- Accreditation: Higher Education Accreditation Commission
- President: Ahmed Salaymeh
- Location: Amman, Jordan
- Language: English
- Website: https://nuct.edu.jo/

National University College of Technology is a Jordanian university with all of its programs passing the special Jordanian accreditation. It is located east of the capital, Amman, in the Abu Alanda region. It was established in 2020. It is licensed to grant bachelor's and diploma degrees from the following specializations:

- Mechanical Engineering/Power Generation (Bachelor)
- Mechanical Engineering / Electric and Hybrid vehicles (Bachelor)
- Mechanical Engineering / Renewable energy (Bachelor)
- Renewable Energy Technology (Bachelor)
- Electrical Power Engineering (Diploma)
- Renewable Energy Technology (Diploma)
- Maintenance of electric and hybrid vehicles (Diploma)
- Oil shale Technology (Diploma)
