= Middle East University (Jordan) =

Jordanian university

Middle East University جـــامـــعـــة الشرق الاوسط
- Type: Private
- Established: 2005
- Affiliations: Association of Arab Universities
- Chairman: Dr. Sana Shaqwara
- President: Prof. Salam Mahadeen
- Location: (Jordan) Amman, Jordan
- Website: meu.edu.jo

Middle East University (MEU) is a private university in Amman, Jordan, owned by the Company Middle East University for Graduate Studies. It is located near the Queen Alia International Airport (QAIA).

== Brief history ==
The university inaugurated its first phase with the name "The Middle East University" on June 30, 2005, after having completed all the requirements of licensing and accreditation including the provision of qualified faculty members and administrative staff, and developed study plans. it is considered one of the distinguished universities in Jordan that offers the Bachelor's and Master's programmes in many educational field for students. The university received the first batch of students in twelve specialized master's program at the beginning of second semester of the academic year 2005/2006.

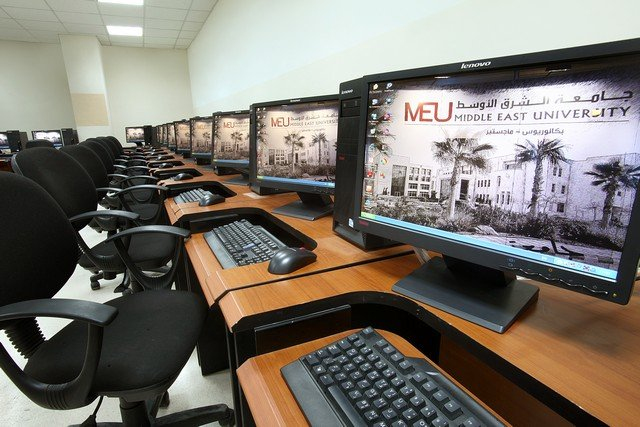
MEU

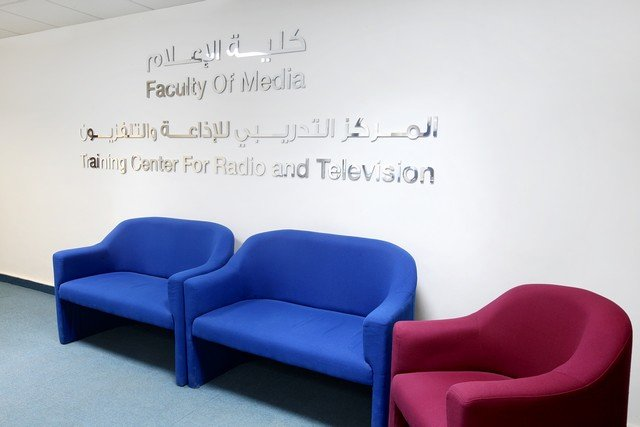
MEU

== Academics ==
There are nine colleges in the university:

- Faculty of Engineering
- Faculty of Information Technology
- Faculty of Media
- Faculty of Educational Sciences
- Faculty of Law
- Faculty of Architecture & Design
- Faculty of Pharmacy
- Faculty of Arts & Sciences
- Faculty of Business
- Faculty of Nursing

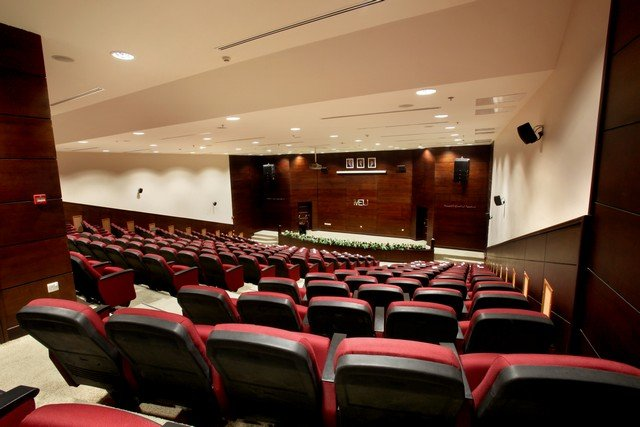
MEU STAGE
