= Sampoerna University =

University in Indonesia

Coordinates: 6°14′52″S 106°50′42″E

- Former names: Sampoerna School of Business; Sampoerna School of Education
- Type: Private
- Established: 2013
- Affiliations: Putera Sampoerna Foundation
- Rector: Prof. Dr. M. Aman Wirakartakusumah
- Location: Jakarta, Indonesia
- Campus: Urban
- Colors: Blue and Gold
- Website: www.sampoernauniversity.ac.id

Sampoerna University (formerly Universitas Siswa Bangsa Internasional) is an international university located in Jakarta, Indonesia. It is the first Indonesian university to offer an accredited U.S. degree entirely within Indonesia.

== History ==
In 2009, the Putera Sampoerna Foundation (PSF) founded the Sampoerna School of Education (SSE) to address the insufficient number of high-quality math and English teachers in Indonesia. This was followed in 2010 by PSF's establishment of the Sampoerna School of Business (SSB) which offered degree programs in accounting, finance, marketing, and management.

In 2013, both SSE and SSB were relaunched as the Faculty of Education and the Faculty of Business and Economics, respectively. Together with newly launched Faculty of Art, Design, and Media and the Faculty of Science and Technology, as well as the new Institute of Languages and Communication, they now constitute the academic units of Universitas Siswa Bangsa Internasional.

== U.S. associate degrees and transfers ==
USBI is the first university to offer an accredited U.S. associate degree in Indonesia. Upon entry to any USBI degree program, students are automatically dual-enrolled in Lone Star College, a community college in Houston, Texas. Students earn both Lone Star College System and USBI credit during their first two years of study. After the successful completion of two years of study, students are awarded a Lone Star College associate degree. This is the first such mechanism awarding American and Indonesian credits to students in Indonesia.

Following the award of an associate degree, students are eligible to transfer to any university in the United States that recognizes Lone Star College System credit. Past transfers from LSCS have graduated from universities such as Harvard, Yale, Princeton, UCLA, Texas A&M University, and Texas Tech University, among others.

== Campus ==
The 6 hectare rental USBI campus is located in Pancoran, South Jakarta. Following a million-dollar renovation in 2012, classrooms now have walls which are usable whiteboard surfaces and can be reconfigured to accommodate large lectures or small discussion groups.

Campus facilities include a 9,000 book library, an auditorium, MBPS soccer field, volleyball court, badminton court, health clinic, a student-run café, two language labs, and three computer labs. Campus space is also devoted to a wet lab for biology and chemistry. A canteen is under development. Four art studios house a photography lab, filming and journalism equipment, and a "future studio" which highlights emerging technologies. A professional game development space is being constructed for teaching and industry collaboration.

== Academics ==
All USBI courses are taught in English and are aligned with industry needs through the oversight of industry advisory boards. The curriculum is designed around experiential learning, with most degree programs requiring an internship. Additionally, all students are required to take courses in leadership, entrepreneurship, and social responsibility.

USBI currently offers 14 undergraduate degree programs and 24 unique conferrable degrees. Students from any degree program may transfer to universities overseas for years three and four of their program, thus earning a total of three degrees (one from USBI, one from Lone Star College System, and one from their overseas university).

== Faculties ==
- Faculty of Art Design and Media
- Faculty of Economics and Business
- Faculty of Education
- Faculty of Engineering and Technology
