= American College of Norway =

Private non-accredited institution located in Moss, Norway

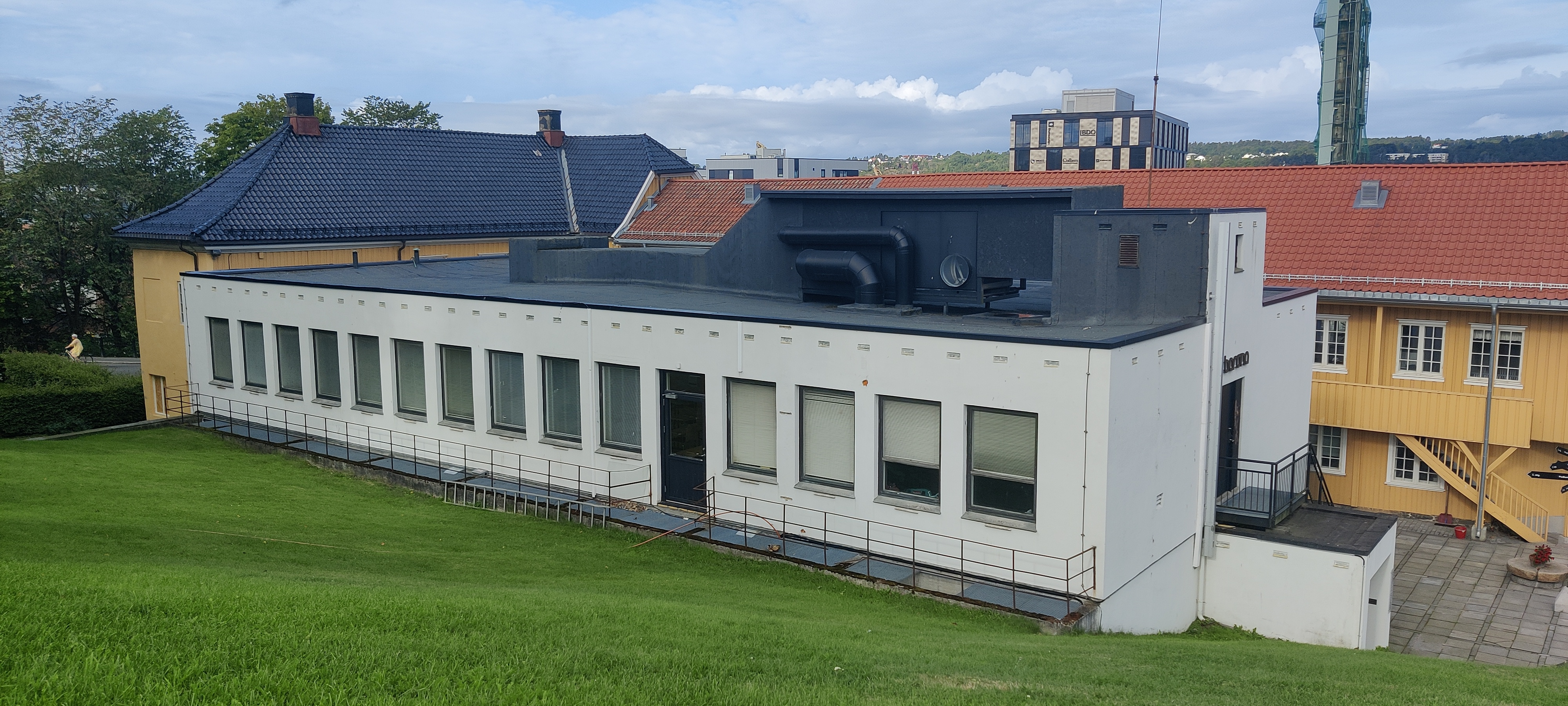
- Established: 1990
- Location: Moss, Norway; 59°26′23″N 10°40′10″E
- Website: americancollege.no
- Location within Norway

The American College of Norway (commonly referred to as ACN) is a private non-accredited institution located in Moss, Norway. It states that it is based on the American liberal arts college model, but is not accredited as a college or other higher education institution in Norway. Its degrees are not recognized by Norwegian universities. It was founded in 1990 by Steinar Opstad. It is run in association with the University of North Dakota in Grand Forks, North Dakota.
