= American University in Bosnia and Herzegovina =

Former private university located in Tuzla, Bosnia and Herzegovina

- Američki univerzitet u Bosni i Hercegovini
- AUBiH logo
- Other name: AUBiH
- Type: Private
- Active: 2005–2021
- President: Denis Prcić
- Provost: Mirsad Đonlagić
- Location: Mije Kerosevica Guje 3, Tuzla, Tuzla, Sarajevo, Bosnia and Herzegovina; 44.533634°N 18.654910°E
- Colors: White and blue

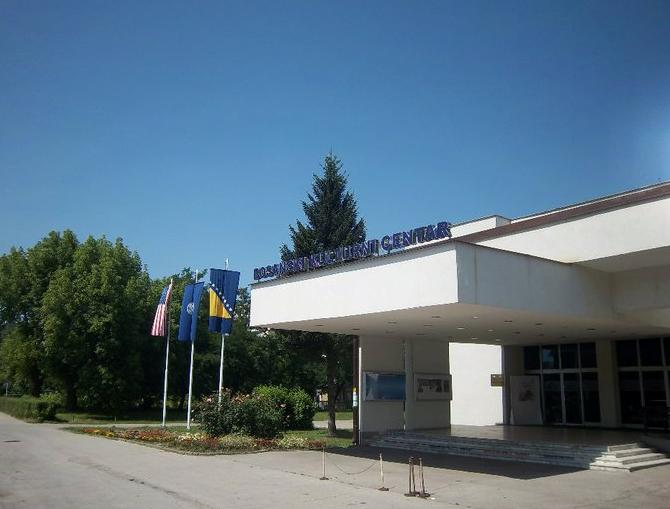
American University in Bosnia and Herzegovina's campus in Tuzla

The American University in Bosnia and Herzegovina (abbr. AUBiH) was a private university located in Tuzla, Bosnia and Herzegovina.

In 2021, the State Investigation and Protection Agency raided the university, arresting the founder and owner Denis Prcić on suspicion of issuing diplomas illegally. American University ceased operating following the investigation into Prcić.

== Staff ==
The founder and president of AUBiH was Denis Prcić, an entrepreneur from Tuzla who earned a bachelor's degree from Rochester Institute of Technology in 2004.

Under a 2006 agreement with the State University of New York at Canton (SUNY Canton), AUBiH hired mostly American lecturing staff to teach at its Tuzla campus, while higher-level courses were taught through online courses by faculty located in Canton, New York. American faculty members were later fired and replaced with native Bosnians, allegedly to cut costs.

Notable faculty included Semir Osmanagić, a businessman best known for promoting the pseudoscientific Bosnian pyramid theory, who was an anthropology professor from 2011 to 2012.

== Academics ==
In 2007, the university opened a postgraduate department in Sarajevo, offering a fast-track master's degree in business administration (MBA). In 2009, it opened an undergraduate department in Banja Luka. In 2011, AUBiH opened an undergraduate department in Mostar.

The University was organized around the following colleges:

- Faculty of Economics
- Faculty of Engineering Science and Technology
- Faculty of Public Affairs
- Academy of Modern Arts

The university offered degrees in law, economics, international relations, cyber security and engineering. In 2012, its website also listed doctoral degree offerings in those fields, thought it was not accredited to run PhD programs.

== Partnerships ==
=== SUNY Canton ===
In 2006, soon after its founding, AUBiH partnered with SUNY Canton with the intention of fostering educational development in a region still recovering from the Bosnian War. AUBiH students involved in the program received double diplomas from both the US and Bosnia & Herzegovina and paid a reduced tuition rate for classes taught by SUNY Canton. There were opportunities for work placement with American companies including Xerox, Microsoft, Johnson & Johnson and Kodak.

However, over the next few years, SUNY Canton received reports from professors and students at AUBiH highlighting concerns about its academic integrity and the leadership of its president, Denis Prcić. Former professors claimed that university officials had hacked into their emails; had encouraged them to fail students that Prcić disliked; and had been personally threatened by Prcić. Students encountered unexpected tuition increases and majors that were advertised but did not exist, which led some to drop out, while others struggled to recover prepaid tuition for undelivered courses.

SUNY Canton reportedly dismissed concerns for years, until March 2011, when the SUNY system's head of international programs found that "AUBiH was not meeting SUNY’s academic criteria". The universities' relationship ended in November 2011, following disputes over tuition and payments.

=== Later partnerships ===
In June 2012, West Virginia University announced a partnership with AUBiH, which was still active as of 2025. In September 2015, AUBiH expanded its international partnerships to include Western Kentucky University, Saint Louis University, Fontbonne University in the US; Saint Paul University in Canada; Northwest Normal University in China; and Doğuş University in Turkey.

== Investigation and shutdown ==
On June 18, 2021, authorities searched American University and arrested its founder, Denis Prcić, and two other university employees. The Prosecutor's Office of Bosnia and Herzegovina charged Prcić with abuse of office, document fraud and destruction of official records, accusing him of issuing a forged American University diploma to Osman Mehmedagić, director of the Intelligence-Security Agency of Bosnia and Herzegovina. Prosecutors initially became suspicious when Mehmedagić, following the annulment of his degree from the University of Banja Luka, submitted a diploma from American University, which he had never mentioned attending before; he was required to have a degree to qualify for his position.

Investigators discovered that pages had been torn out of the student registrar books, and new ones containing Mehmedagić's name had been inserted. The server containing American University's student data, which was missing during the search, was found hidden in a vacation home in Semizovac; it did not contain Mehmedagić's name. In violation of a court ban on meeting witnesses, Prcić pressured one witness to give false testimony and attacked another at a shopping center in Sarajevo, though he claimed it was in self-defense. The prosecutor's office later expanded the investigation, suspecting that American University had issued other forged diplomas, including one to Amina Pekić, a Ministry of Foreign Affairs employee whose brother worked for Mehmedagić.

Emails were also discovered showing Prcić had demanded students pay a KM 1,500 fee toward the university's American accreditation with ACICS in 2020. This was despite the university already being reaccredited until the end of the year, and despite him withdrawing the university from further accreditation so it could not issue diplomas valid in the United States after 2020. The Cantonal Court of Tuzla affirmed the indictment against him in July 2023, finding that there was reasonable suspicion he had committed fraud and abuse of authority. In June 2026, Prcić was sentenced by the court to three years in prison and required to return the accreditation money to students.
