= Madaba =

City in Madaba Governorate, Jordan

Madaba مادبا
- City
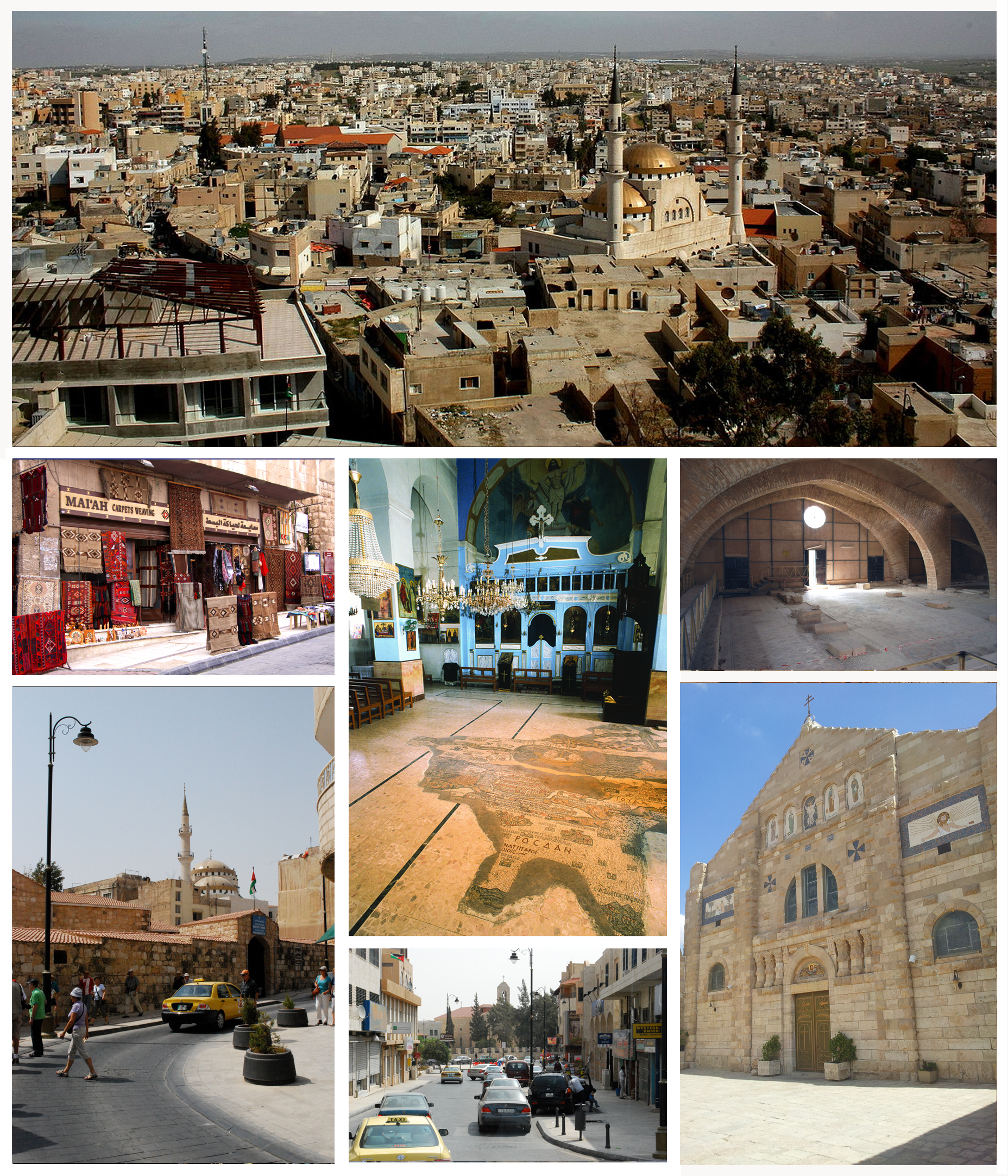
- top: Madaba with King Hussein Mosque (built 2007); middle row: souvenir shops, Madaba Map (mosaic floor), Byzantine Church of the Apostles; bottom row: entrance to Madaba Archaeological Park (left side of the street), street to Orthodox St. George Church (on the right), Catholic Church of the Beheading of Saint John the Baptist.

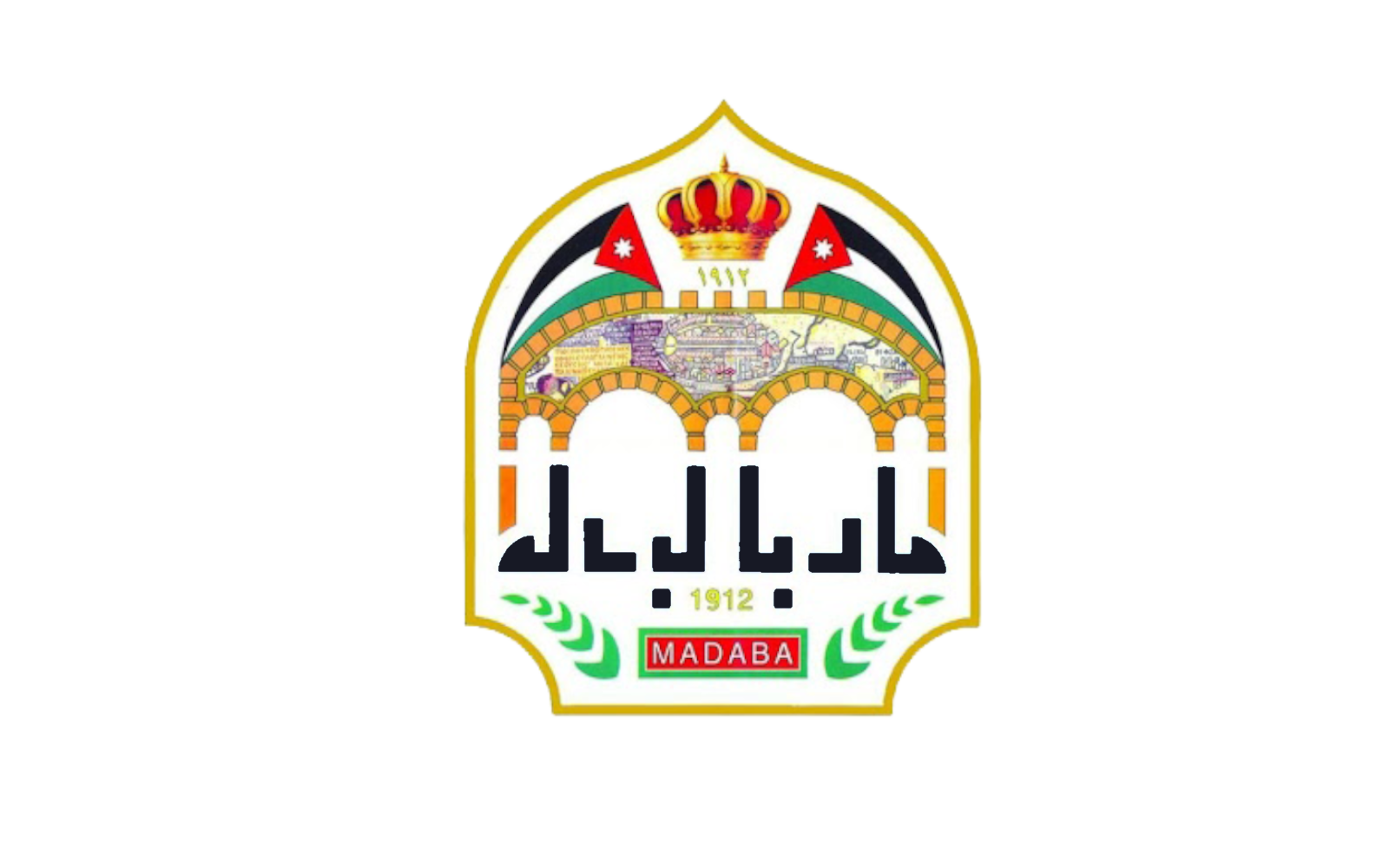
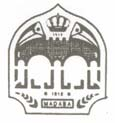
- Flag Seal
- Nickname: City of Mosaics (used in tourism promotion)
- Location in Jordan
- Coordinates: 31°43′N 35°48′E
- Country: Jordan
- Governorate: Madaba Governorate
- Municipality established: 1921

Government
  - Type: Municipality
  - Mayor: Mustafa Al-Ma'ay'ya

Area
  - City: 39.440 km^{2} (15.228 sq mi)
  - Metro: 100 km^{2} (39 sq mi)
- Elevation: 763 m (2,503 ft)

Population (December 2011)
  - City: 84,600 ▲
- Time zone: UTC+2 (UTC+2)
  - Summer (DST): UTC+3 (UTC+3)
- Area code: +(962) 5
- Website: www.madabacity.gov.jo/

Madaba (Arabic: مادبا, romanized: Mādaba or Arabic: مأدبا, romanized: Maʾdaba) is the capital city of Madaba Governorate in central Jordan, with a population of about 60,000. It is best known for its Byzantine- and Umayyad-period mosaics on Christian and Greco-Roman mythological subjects, especially a large Byzantine-era mosaic map of the Holy Land. Madaba is located on the Madaba Plateau, 30 kilometres (19 miles) south-west of the capital Amman.

== History ==
=== Bronze Age ===
Madaba dates from the Middle Bronze Age.

=== Iron Age ===
The town of Madaba was once a Moabite border city, mentioned in the Bible in Numbers 21:30 and Joshua 13:9. Control over the city changed back and forth between Israel and Moab, as mentioned in the Mesha Stele.

=== Classical Antiquity ===
Named in Ancient Greek: Μήδαβα. During its rule by the Roman and Byzantine empires from the 2nd to the 7th centuries, the city formed part of the province of Arabia Petraea set up by the Roman Emperor Trajan to replace the Nabataean kingdom of Petra.

The first evidence for a Christian community in the city, with its own bishop, is found in the Acts of the Council of Chalcedon in 451, where Constantine, Metropolitan Archbishop of Bostra (the provincial capital) signed on behalf of Gaiano, "Bishop of the Medabeni." It was conquered by the Rashidun Caliphate in 629 after the Battle of Mut'ah.

During the rule of the Islamic Umayyad Caliphate, it was part of the southern district of Jund Filastin within the Bilad al-Sham province.

=== Modern settlement ===
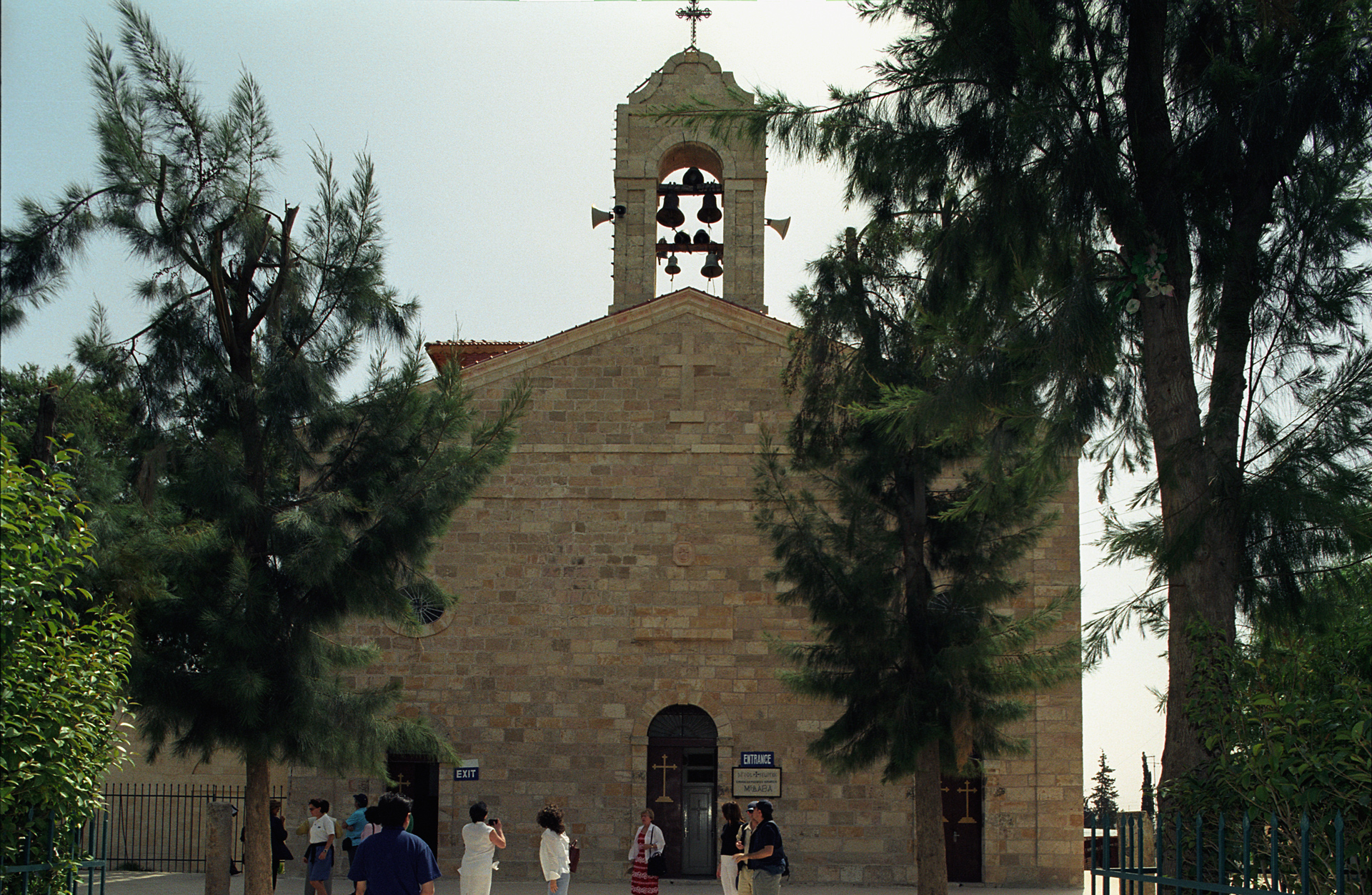
Greek Orthodox Basilica of Saint George, Madaba

In 1880, 90 Arab Christian families from Al Karak resettled the ruins of Madaba, led by two Italian priests from the Latin Patriarchate of Jerusalem. The Christian families had petitioned the Turkish government to be allowed to resettle Madaba, by then just large tell, after tensions arose with Muslim families in Al Karak. The government also gave the permission for the rebuilding of churches on the sites of ancient churches from antiquity. In 1884, it was the clearance of debris from one such site that led to the uncovering of the 6th-century Madaba Map mosaic.

The Catholic Church's list of titular sees uses the spelling "Medaba", in reference to the ancient bishopric located in this city, while referring to the modern city as "Madaba".

Today, the city is the seat of Madaba Governorate and is the 9th-biggest city in Jordan, with a population of 122,008 as of 2021.

== Archaeological finds ==
=== In Madaba city ===
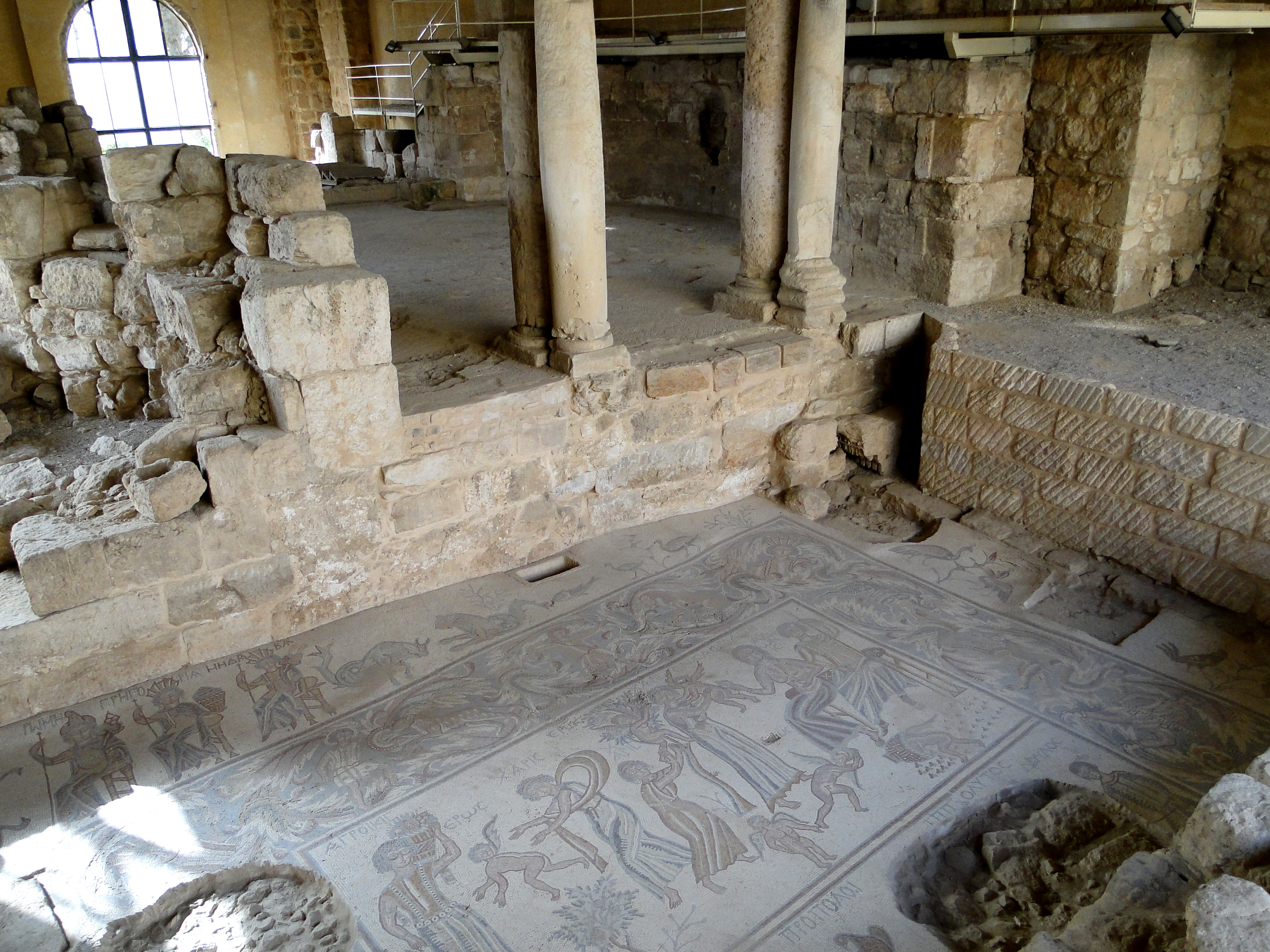
Hippolytus Hall in the Archaeological Park of Madaba

The first mosaics were discovered during the building of new houses using bricks from older buildings. The new inhabitants of Madaba, made conscious of the importance of the mosaics by their priests, made sure that they took care of and preserved all the mosaics that came to light.

The northern part of the city turned out to be the area containing the greatest concentration of mosaics. During the Byzantine-Umayyad period, this northern area, crossed by a colonnaded Roman road, saw the building of the Church of the Map, the Hippolytus Mansion, the Church of the Virgin Mary, the Church of Prophet Elijah with its crypt, the Church of the Holy Martyrs (Al-Khadir), the Burnt Palace, the Church of the Sunna' family, and the church of the salaita family.

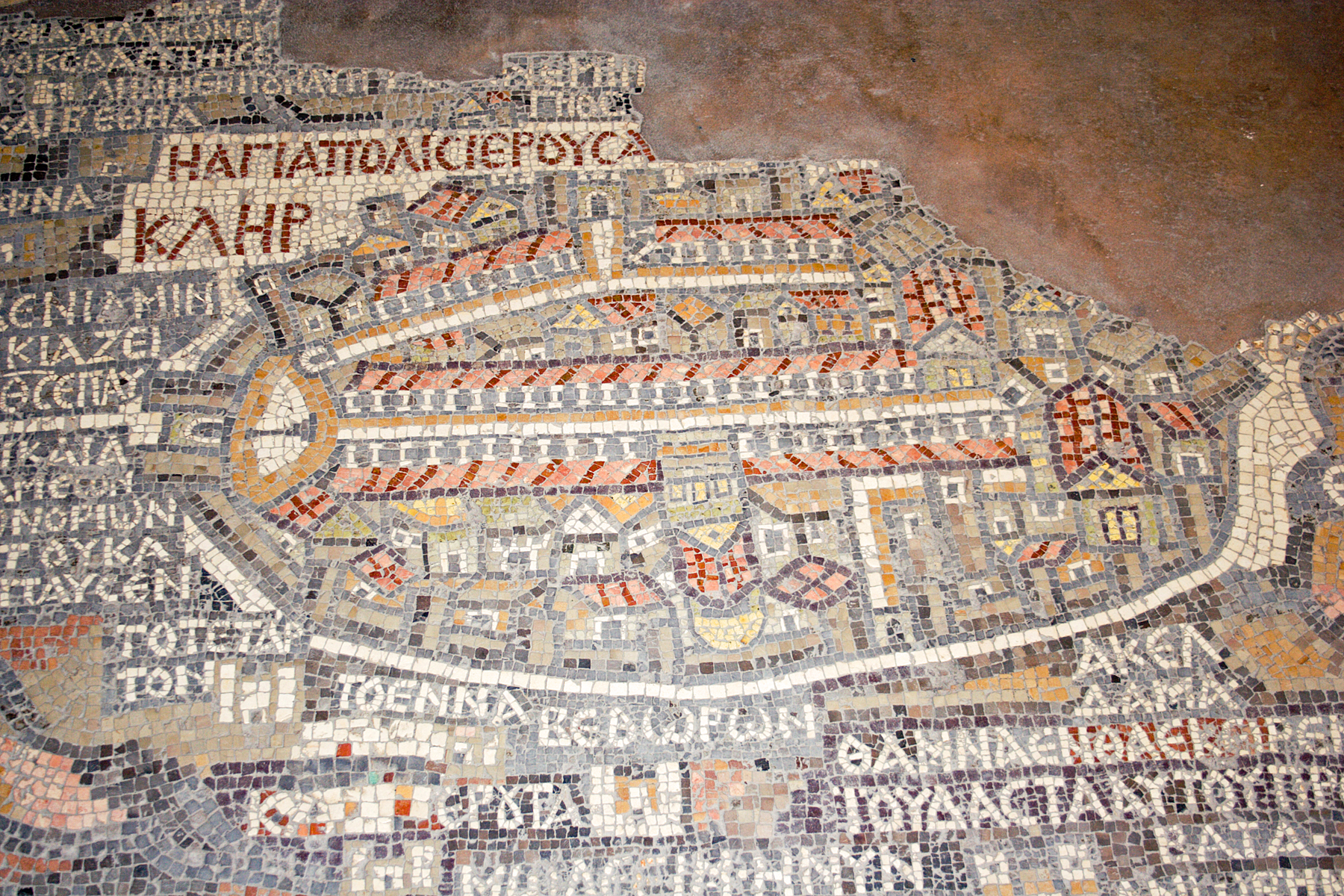
A 6th-century mosaic map of Jerusalem in the Madaba Map

The Madaba Map mosaic was discovered in 1884 during the construction of the church of St. George, but was only properly investigated more than a decade later in 1896 after it was witnessed by Father Kleopas Koikyides, the librarian of the Patriarchate of Jerusalem. In 1897, he published a reliable sketch and his findings on the relic in a commentary in Greek entitled: The Geographical Madaba Mosaic Map on Syria, Palestine and Egypt.

The Madaba Map dates from the 6th century and is preserved in the floor of the modern Greek Orthodox Basilica of Saint George, sometimes also called the "Church of the Map". With two million pieces of coloured stone, the map depicts hills and valleys, villages and towns in Palestine and the Nile Delta. The mosaic contains the earliest extant representation of Byzantine Jerusalem, labeled the "Holy City." The map provides important details about its 6th-century landmarks, with the cardo, or central colonnaded street, and the church of the Holy Sepulchre clearly visible. This map is one key in developing scholarly knowledge about the physical layout of Jerusalem after its destruction and rebuilding in 70 AD.

Other mosaic masterpieces found in the Church of the Virgin and the Apostles and the Archaeological Museum, depict a profusion of flowers and plants, birds and fish, animals and exotic beasts, as well as scenes from mythology and everyday pursuits of hunting, fishing and farming. Hundreds of other mosaics from the 5th through the 7th centuries are scattered throughout Madaba.

The University of Toronto has been excavating in Madaba from 1996 until the present. Their efforts have focused primarily on the west acropolis where an open field has allowed access to uncover the entire sequence of occupation at Madaba from the modern period down to the Early Bronze Age levels. The most visible feature of this area is a 7.5-meter-wide (25 ft) fortification wall built sometime in the 9th century BC, with subsequent rebuilds throughout its history. There is also the remains of a well-preserved Byzantine-era house at the base of the fortification wall.

In 2010, a 3,000-year-old Iron Age temple containing several figurines of ancient deities and circular clay vessels used in Moabite religious rituals was discovered at Khirbat 'Ataroz near Mabada.

=== In Khirbat Ataruz ===
Khirbat Ataruz, also known as Ataroth, is mentioned prominently in the Mesha stele and its ruins are located in Madaba Governorate, outside of Madaba city. It was conquered by Israelite King Omri, as discussed in the Mesha stele, Book of Numbers 32, and 2nd Books of Kings 3:4–27. The oldest inscription in the Moabite language script, dated to the late 9th or early 8th century BC, was found at Khirbat Ataruz.

=== Madaba Institute for Mosaic Art and Restoration ===
The Institute of Mosaic Art and Restoration was founded in 1992 as the Madaba Mosaic School, and funded by the Italian government. It was a high school which offered the Tawjihi, the Jordanian equivalent of a high school diploma. In 2007, the Ministry of Tourism and Antiquities, under the Department of Antiquities, partnered with USAID's Siyaha tourism development project, and the Italian government to launch the institute as a two-year, post-secondary educational program. The institute offers diplomas in Mosaic Art Production and Restoration. The institute is located between the Madaba Visitors Center and the Madaba Archaeological Park.

== Climate ==
Madaba has a hot-summer Mediterranean climate (Köppen climate classification Csa). Most rain falls in the winter. The average annual temperature in Madaba is 16.4 °C (61.5 °F). About 346 mm (13.62 in) of precipitation falls annually.

Climate data for Madaba
| Month | Jan | Feb | Mar | Apr | May | Jun | Jul | Aug | Sep | Oct | Nov | Dec | Year |
|---|---|---|---|---|---|---|---|---|---|---|---|---|---|
| Mean daily maximum °C (°F) | 12.2 (54.0) | 13.9 (57.0) | 16.9 (62.4) | 22.2 (72.0) | 26.5 (79.7) | 29.2 (84.6) | 30.2 (86.4) | 30.3 (86.5) | 29.3 (84.7) | 26.5 (79.7) | 20.1 (68.2) | 13.7 (56.7) | 22.6 (72.7) |
| Mean daily minimum °C (°F) | 3.3 (37.9) | 4.1 (39.4) | 5.8 (42.4) | 9.0 (48.2) | 12.1 (53.8) | 14.8 (58.6) | 16.4 (61.5) | 16.7 (62.1) | 15.1 (59.2) | 12.5 (54.5) | 8.8 (47.8) | 4.6 (40.3) | 10.3 (50.5) |
| Average precipitation mm (inches) | 81 (3.2) | 75 (3.0) | 63 (2.5) | 16 (0.6) | 5 (0.2) | 0 (0) | 0 (0) | 0 (0) | 0 (0) | 4 (0.2) | 36 (1.4) | 66 (2.6) | 346 (13.6) |
Source: Climate-Data.org, Climate data

== Points of interest ==
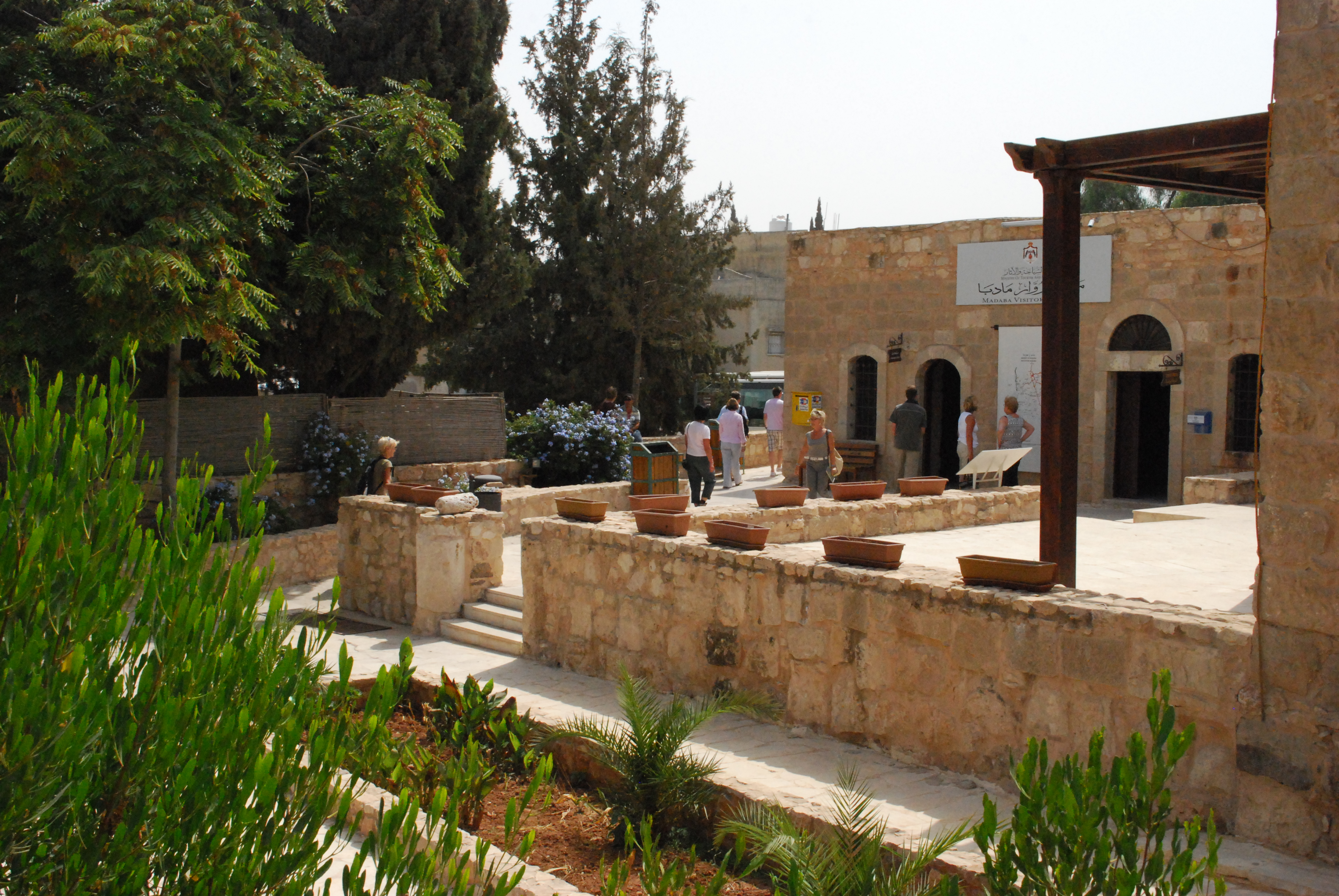
The Madaba visitors center

- Madaba's main attraction is its Byzantine mosaics, drawing many visitors, especially since the creation of an archaeological park. They cover the floors of houses and churches dating from the site's earliest period of habitation.
- Southwest of Madaba is Hammamat Ma'in (Ma'in Hot Springs), thermal mineral springs that for centuries have attracted people for its purported therapeutic properties.
- The nearby site of Umm ar-Rasas, south-east of Madaba on the edge of the semi-arid steppe, started as a Roman military camp and grew to become a town from the 5th century. It also has very large and well-preserved mosaics.
- At the southern entrance to Madaba, near the King's Highway, is the Church of the Apostles. The ruins of this Byzantine church date to 578 CE, and are currently being restored. It includes a mosaic known as the "Personification of the Sea", depicting a woman emerging from the sea, surrounded by mythical aquatic creatures and a hodgepodge of rams, bulls, parrots and exotic vegetation. The mosaic was signed by a mosaicist named Salamanios.

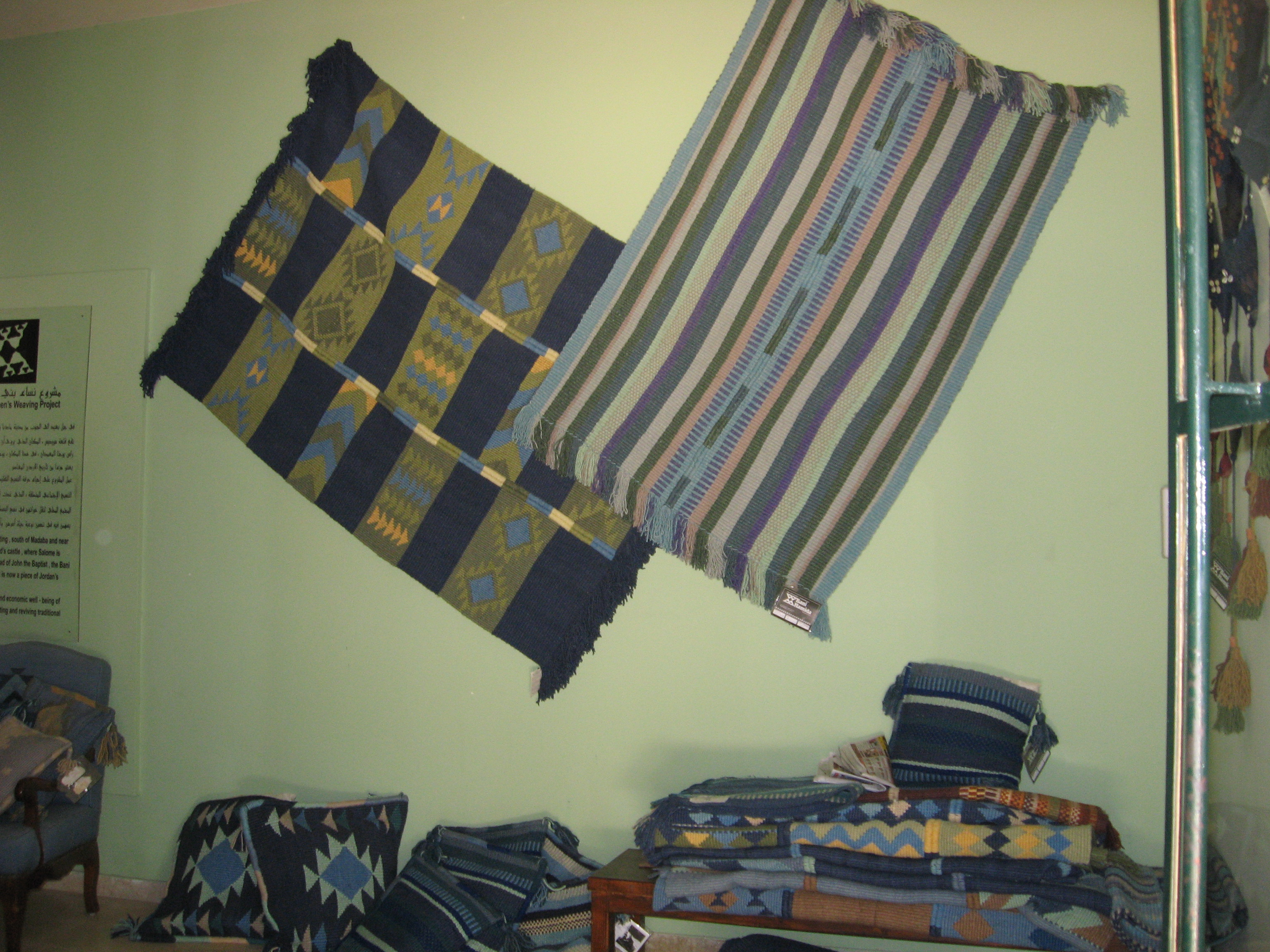
Bani Hamida Weavings

- A weaving project started by twelve women of the Bani Hamida tribe in 1985 produces woven items in traditionally bright colors. Traditional ground looms, assembled using stones and sticks, are used for the weaving, and the products can be found at numerous outlets in Jordan and abroad. Visitors can stop by the weaving rooms, located in the village of Mukawir, to see how the rugs are made. The women also make decorative candles.
- The American University of Madaba opened in 2011, and is located on a 100-acre campus outside the city.

== International relations ==
=== Twin towns – sister cities ===
Madaba is twinned with:

- Bethlehem, Palestine
- (United States) Denton, Texas

== See also ==
- Early Byzantine mosaics in the Middle East
- Ghassanids, Arab Christian tribal alliance and dynasty
- Isaiah 15

== Bibliography ==
- Rantzow, George Louis Albert, de (German name Georg Ludwig Albrecht von Rantzau, often named Jørgen Ludvig Albert de Rantzow). Mémoires du comte de Rantzow, vol. 1, Pierre Mortier Amsterdam (1741). First translation ever published by Renate Ricarda Timmermann: Die Memoiren des Grafen von Rantzau, vol. 1, Profund-Verlag (2015), ISBN 978-3-932651-14-4
