= American University of Phnom Penh =

Private university in Cambodia

Coordinates: 11°34′37.7″N 104°53′35.49″E

- សាកលវិទ្យាល័យអាមេរិកាំងភ្នំពេញ
- Motto: Study Locally, Live Globally
- Type: Private
- Established: August 2013; 13 years ago
- Academic staff: 100+
- Students: 2000+
- Location: 278H Street 201R, Russei Keo, Phnom Penh, Cambodia
- Colors
- Website: aupp.edu.kh

The American University of Phnom Penh (AUPP; Khmer: សាកលវិទ្យាល័យអាមេរិកាំងភ្នំពេញ, GD: Sakalvityealai Amerikang Phnom Penh [saːkɑlʋɨtjiəlaj ʔamerikaŋ pʰnom pəɲ]) is a private English-medium university founded in August 2013, with a campus in Phnom Penh, Cambodia. The university currently offers four-year American dual degree programs as well as stand-alone Bachelor's and MBA programs."Master's Programs".

== History ==
AUPP was established in 2013 as a Cambodian university with an American curriculum. There were three founders who envisioned a new university that would meet international standards and be based on the US educational system.

In the summer of 2016, AUPP signed agreements for dual degrees with the University of Arizona and Fort Hays State University. The University of Arizona dual programs included Business Administration and Law, while the dual degrees with Fort Hays State University were in Tourism and Hospitality Management, and Computer Science.

AUPP’s new modern facility was finished in October 2017.

== Campus ==
AUPP was relocated to its new campus located at 278H Street 201R, Russei Kéo, Phnom Penh, Cambodia, in the middle of 2017.

== Academics ==
AUPP signed a Micro Campus agreement with University of Arizona (UA) and a Dual Degree agreement with Fort Hays State University (FHSU) at the AUPP campus in Phnom Penh, under which they entered into a cooperative arrangement to deliver dual degree programs to AUPP students. This made it possible for the first time that a U.S. degree could be completed by Cambodian students entirely in Cambodia. The programs offered by AUPP with U of A and FHSU are “dual degrees”, meaning that students who finish four years of study at AUPP will receive one bachelor's degree from AUPP and another from the American Partner University. This agreement also allows AUPP students to study abroad at UA or at FHSU in the United States for one or two semesters, depending on their choice of major.

AUPP offers the following undergraduate majors.

1. Bachelor of Science in Business / Business Administration (Available in Single Dual Degree with University of Arizona)
2. Bachelor of Arts in Communications (Dual Degree with University of Arizona)
3. Bachelor of Arts in e-Society (Dual Degree with University of Arizona)
4. Bachelor of Arts in Law (Dual Degree with University of Arizona)
5. Bachelor of Arts in Global Affairs
6. Bachelor of Science in Information Technology Management / Computer Science (Dual Degree with Fort Hays State University)
7. Bachelor of Science in Information and Communications Technology (MIS and Software Specialization)
8. Bachelor of Science in Information System/Data Analytics (Dual Degree with Fort Hays State University)
9. Bachelor of Science in Web and Mobile Application Development / Interactive App Design and Development (Dual Degree with Fort Hays State University)
10. Bachelor of Science in Digital Infrastructure
11. Bachelor of Science in Cybersecurity
12. Bachelor of Science in Software Development
13. Bachelor of Science in Artificial Intelligence

The American University of Phnom Penh offers the following graduate degrees:

1. Master of Business Administration (Available in Single and Dual Degree with Fort Hays State University)
2. Master of Laws
3. Master of Legal Studies
4. Master of Computer Science - Artificial Intelligence (Available in Single and Dual Degree with Fort Hays State University)
5. Master of Laws in Artificial Intelligence
6. Master of Laws in Cybersecurity

== AUPP License and Accreditations ==
American University of Phnom Penh (AUPP) was established in 2013 with a license by the then Prime Minister of Cambodia. AUPP operates as a private university under the Ministry of Education, Youth and Sport supervision. AUPP is fully accredited from 2019 to 2028. The institutional accreditation covers all degree programs as part of the national standards.

AUPP offers single-degree programs nationally accredited under the institutional accreditation and, since 2016, dual-degree programs in partnerships with the University of Arizona and Fort Hays State University, which are accredited by WSCUC and Higher Learning Commission, respectively, in the USA.

AUPP’s Faculty of Business & Management is also accredited by the Certified Management Accountants (CMA) and the Chartered Management Institute (CMI).

AUPP has become the first higher education institution in Cambodia to join Advance HE, a leading international organization dedicated to enhancing teaching, leadership, governance, and equality in higher education.

AUPP has been officially recognized as an Authorized Training Partner (ATP) of the Project Management Institute (PMI), the world’s leading organization for project management professionals.

== Student life ==
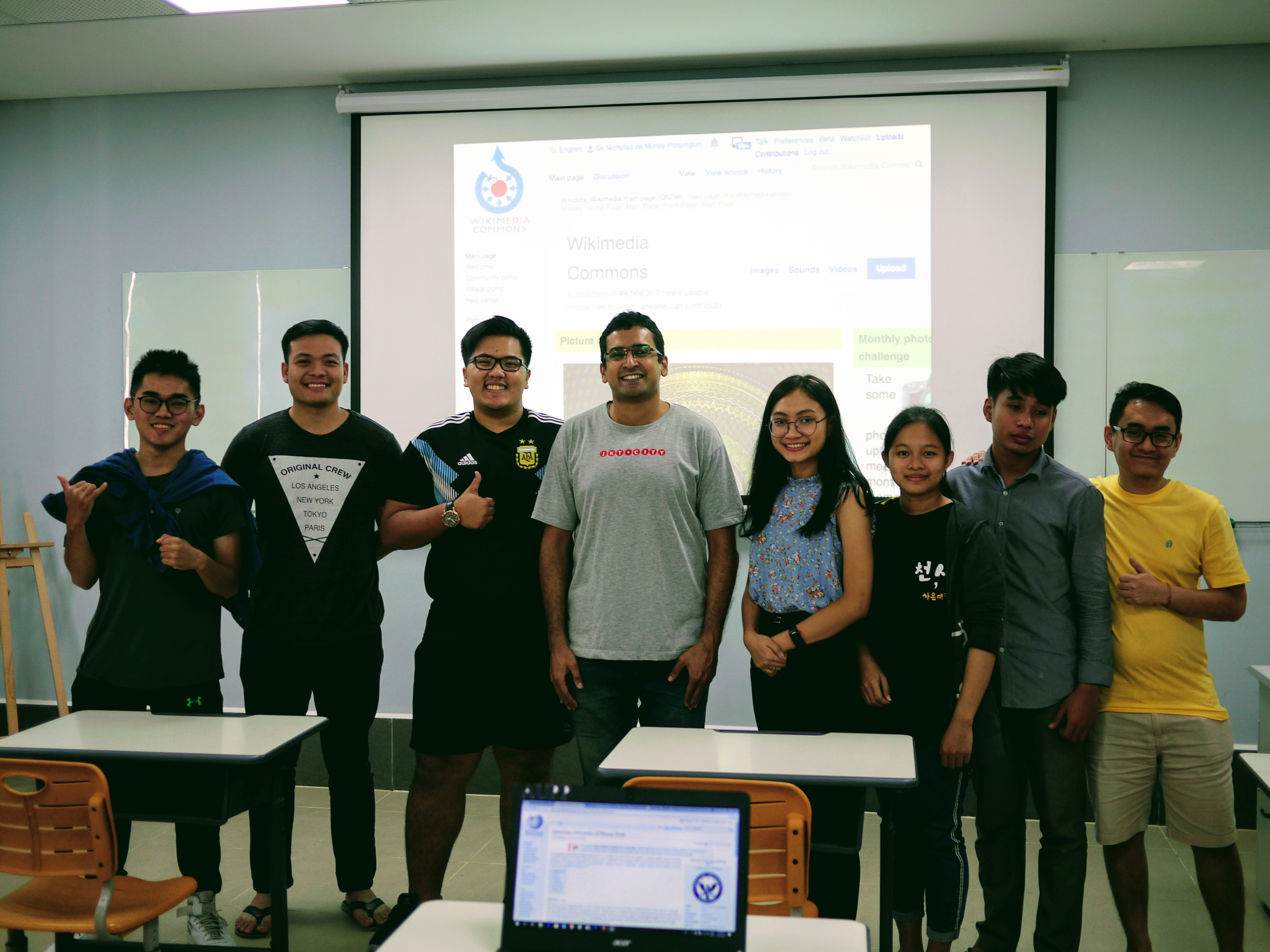
AUPP students at a Wikipedia workshop in September 2018.

AUPP’s student clubs include RUNNING CLUB with a motto "Rain or Shine, We Run", Music Club, Dance Club (K-pop & Traditional Khmer), Art Club, Volleyball Club, Basketball Club, Soccer Club, Tennis Club, Badminton Club, Pride Club, Mental Health Club, Astrology Club, Table Top Club, Vlog Club, Debate Club, Coin & Stamp Club, Green Aids Club, Book Club, Entrepreneur Club, Real Estate Club, Cooking Club, and several others. Students are also involved in service-learning projects (social responsibility). The elected Student Government Association (SGA) provides leadership opportunities, organizes field trips, and organizes a speaker series which further round out students’ education.

== Institutional Milestones ==
- 2013: AUPP officially opens.
- 2016: Launch of international partnerships and dual degree programs with UA and FHSU allowing students to graduate with a U.S. accredited degrees in Cambodia
- 2017: AUPP relocates to its new state-of-the-art campus.
- 2017: First AUPP graduating class ceremony.
- 2020: Launch of master’s degree programs at AUPP.
- 2023: AUPP celebrates its 10-year anniversary.
- 2024: AUPP hosts the IBTSS International Conference on the Integration of Business, Digital Technology, and Social Sciences for a Sustainable ASEAN and Beyond.
- 2025: Fall 2025 intake sets the highest enrollment record in AUPP’s history.
