= RIT Croatia =

Satellite campus of the Rochester Institute of Technology

- Seal of the Rochester Institute of Technology
- Type: Satellite campus of Rochester Institute of Technology
- Established: 1997
- Academic affiliations: Rochester Institute of Technology
- Dean: Irena Guszak
- Students: 850
- Location: Dubrovnik & Zagreb, Croatia; 42°38′29″N 18°6′6″E
- Campus: Urban
- Colors: Orange
- Nickname: Tigers
- Mascot: RITchie (Tiger)
- Website: www.rit.edu/croatia/

The Rochester Institute of Technology Croatia, previously known as the American College of Management and Technology is a satellite campus of the Rochester Institute of Technology located in Dubrovnik, and in Zagreb, Croatia. It is the only higher education institution which grants both American and Croatian degrees. As an integral part of RIT, it has earned many international accreditations, such as The Middle States Commission on Higher Education and the AACSB International, The Association to Advance Collegiate Schools of Business for the quality of programs. Additionally, RIT Croatia has been accredited by the Agency for Science and Higher Education (Ministry of Science and Education (Croatia)).

Completion of the four-year program results in an American Bachelor of Science awarded by RIT, and an equivalent Croatian degree. The college also offers a graduate degree.

RIT provides career-oriented education, focusing on preparing students for their careers and the (global) job market. RIT Croatia promotes diversity, curiosity, innovation, and integrity. The faculty teaches students to think critically and make independent decisions as well as improve their leadership and communication skills.

== Curriculum ==
RIT Croatia offers the following US programs on their Dubrovnik and Zagreb campuses:

1. Service Leadership and Innovation - Master of Science - Zagreb campus
2. Tourism and hospitality - Dubrovnik campus
3. Information Technology / Web and Mobile Computing - Zagreb and Dubrovnik campus
4. International Business - Zagreb campus

Starting with the 2009/2010 academic year, a program of study in the field of Information Technology will be offered based upon RIT's degree program first offered in 1992. Concentrations are offered in these topics:

1. Web development
2. Database
3. Networks
4. System administration

Starting with 2014/2015, RIT Croatia will offer three concentrations for IB (International Business) students:

1. Marketing
2. Finance
3. Management
