= American University in Dubai =

Private university in Dubai Media City, Dubai, UAE

Coordinates: 25°5′27″N 55°9′23″E

- Campus of the American University in Dubai
- Motto: Get Life Ready
- Type: Private for-profit university
- Established: 1 October 1995
- President: Kyle Long
- Provost: Assaad Farah
- Academic staff: 109 (Fall 2022)
- Administrative staff: 101
- Students: 1,800 (Fall 2022)
- Location: Dubai, United Arab Emirates
- Colors: Blue
- Mascot: AUD Knights
- Website: https://www.aud.edu/

The American University in Dubai (AUD) (Arabic: الجامعة الأمريكية في دبي, romanized: Al-Jāmiʻah al-Amrīkīyah fī Dubayy) is a private, for-profit university located in Dubai Media City, United Arab Emirates. Established in 1995, AUD offers undergraduate and graduate programs through its school of Business Administration, Engineering, Architecture, Art and Design, Communication, Arts and Sciences, and Education. The university provides a globally recognized American-style education with a strong emphasis on experiential learning, industry engagement, and career readiness.

AUD is accredited in United States by the Southern Association of Colleges and Schools Commission on Colleges (SACSCOC) and the UAE Ministry of Higher Education and Scientific Research (MOHESR). It serves a diverse student body of over 2,000 students representing more than 100 nationalities, supported by an international faculty.

Located in one of Dubai's key business and media hubs, AUD offers students access to internship and career opportunities across leading regional and global organizations. Its campus spans approximately 1.3 million square feet and includes academic, residential, and recreational facilities.

University rankings

Global – Overall
- QS World: =678 (2026)

== History ==
Following the 1991 Gulf War, Elias Bou Saab and his team from the American Intercontinental University explored establishing an American-style university in the Persian Gulf due to a lack of quality private education.

Dubai was identified as an ideal location due to political stability and growing education sector. Bou Saab then established the American University in Dubai in 1995 with the support of Sheikh Mohammed Bin Rashid Al Maktoum.

AUD rapidly grew after starting with 165 students. In 2000, it moved to a new campus of 1,400,000 square feet with 687 students. The university was then officially licensed by the UAE Ministry of Higher Education and Scientific Research in 2000, highlighting big growth in the region's private higher education sector.

On the same year, AUD's largest academic department & school, Business Administration, was established. In 2001, a memorandum of understanding was signed between the American University in Dubai (AUD) and the Georgia Institute of Technology of Atlanta, GA to establish a School of Engineering.

Representatives from Georgia Tech, including six senior faculty and administrative officers, visited AUD to finalize the adaptation of curricula to the requirements of the UAE.

== Academics ==
AUD is accredited to grant bachelor's and master's degrees by the Southern Association of Colleges and Schools Commission on Colleges (SACSCOC). It is also licensed by the Ministry of Higher Education and Scientific Research of the United Arab Emirates which accredits all the university's programs.

AUD is authorized to operate by the State of Georgia Nonpublic Postsecondary Education Commission (NPEC). AUD's undergraduate majors in Marketing Communications and Advertising have been accredited by the International Advertising Association (IAA) in New York.

The Mohammed Bin Rashid School for Communication is accredited by the Accrediting Council on Education in Journalism and Mass Communications (ACEJMC).

== See also ==
- Americans in the United Arab Emirates
- University of Wollongong in Dubai
- American University of Armenia (AUA)
- American University in Cairo (AUC)
- American University of Beirut (AUB)
- American University of Iraq, Sulaimani (AUIS)
- American University of Kuwait (AUK)
- American University of Sharjah (AUS)
- American University in the Emirates (AUE)
