= At-Taibah District, Irbid =

District of Irbid Governorate, Jordan

Al-Taybeh District لواء الطيبة
- District
- Liwā’aţ Ţayibeh
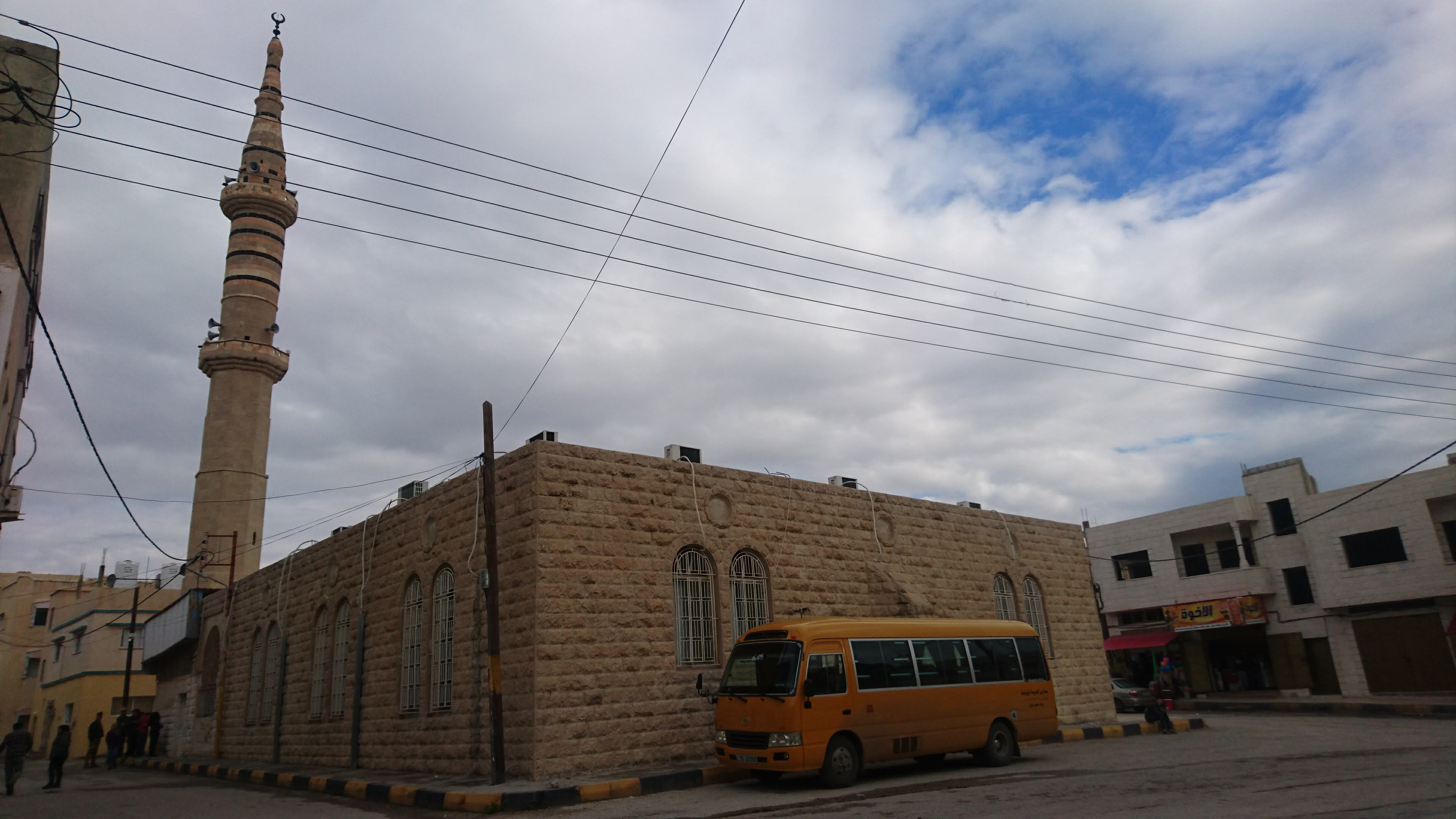
- Great Mosque, Taybeh

- Location within Jordan
- Country: Jordan
- Province: Irbid

Area
  - Total: 63.47 km^{2} (24.51 sq mi)
- Elevation: 388.3 m (1,274 ft)

Population (2015)
  - Total: 51,501
  - Density: 811.4/km^{2} (2,102/sq mi)
- Time zone: UTC3 (GMT +3)
- ZIP Code: 21810
- Geocode: AJLUN-VHACL

Aṭ-Ṭaībah District, also known as Al-Taybeh (Arabic: الطيبة), is one of the districts of Irbid Governorate in Jordan. This administrative division encompasses several villages, with Taibah serving as its central hub. Other villages under its jurisdiction include Samma, Dīr as-Sa'nah, Makhraaba, Mindah, Zibdah, and Absir Abū Alī.

== Geographic location ==
Aṭ-Ṭaībah District is strategically positioned between the Al-Kūrah and Al-Wasṭīyah districts, as well as the Northern Jordan Valley and the western municipality of Irbid.

== Notable landmarks ==
- The Great Mosque of Taybeh (مسجد الطيبة الكبير)
