= Habaka =

Habaka حَبَكا
- Town
- Location in Jordan
- Coordinates: 32°28′N 35°51′E
- PAL: 229/208
- Country: Jordan
- Governorate: Irbid Governorate

Population (2015)
  - Total: 4,114
- Time zone: UTC + 2

Habaka (Arabic: حَبَكا) is a small hill town in northern Jordan, located 75 km north of the capital Amman, and about 5 km south of Irbid. The region has a very fertile soil along with suitable climate allows the growing of a wide variety of high-quality crops. The main products are olives and grapes. There is a substantial area of pine forests on the hills that are extending from Ajloun. Habaka had a population of 4114 in 2015.

== History ==
Recent discoveries in the area of Tell Johfiyeh, which is in Johfiyeh near Habaka, goes back to the Iron Age.

The town was home to Islamic scholar Ali bin Ziadah bin Abd Alrahman Alhabaki Alshafie (Arabic: علي بن زيادة بن عبد الرحمن الحبكي الشافعي), died in 1364.

In 1596, during the Ottoman Empire, Habaka was noted in the census as being located in the nahiya of Bani al-Asar in the Liwa of Hawran. It had a population of 18 households and 11 bachelors, all Muslim. They paid a fixed tax-rate of 25% on various agricultural products which includes wheat, barley, summer crops, vineyards/fruit trees, goats and beehives in addition to occasional revenues. The total comes to 8,000 akçe.

In 1838 Habaka was noted as being ruined/deserted.

The Jordanian census of 1961 found 428 inhabitants in Habaka.

== Demographics ==
(1994 Est.)

- Population: 1775
- Male: 2500
- Female: 3254
- Families: 450
- Buildings: 500
- Residential units: 326
- Schools: 3

== Bibliography ==
- Government of Jordan, Department of Statistics (1964). First Census of Population and Housing. Volume I: Final Tables; General Characteristics of the Population (PDF).
- Hütteroth, W.-D.; Abdulfattah, K. (1977). Historical Geography of Palestine, Transjordan and Southern Syria in the Late 16th Century. Erlanger Geographische Arbeiten, Sonderband 5. Erlangen, Germany: Vorstand der Fränkischen Geographischen Gesellschaft. ISBN 3-920405-41-2.
- Robinson, E.; Smith, E. (1841). Biblical Researches in Palestine, Mount Sinai and Arabia Petraea: A Journal of Travels in the year 1838. Vol. 3. Boston: Crocker & Brewster.
