= Fayez al-Dwairi =

Retired major general of the Jordanian Armed Forces, military expert and strategist

- فايز الدويري
- Born: Fayez Muhammad Hamad al-Dwairi; 3 March 1952 (age 74); Kitim, Banī 'Obeīd, Irbid
- Military career
- Other work: Author, media contributor
- Military career
- Allegiance: Jordan
- Branch: Royal Jordanian Army
- Service years: 1972-2003
- Rank: Major General
- Unit: Royal Jordanian Engineer Corps

Fayez Muhammad Hamad al-Dwairi (Arabic: فايز محمد حمد الدويري, romanized: Fāyiz Muḥammad Ḥamd al-Duwayrī; born 3 March 1952) is a retired major general of the Jordanian Armed Forces, and military strategist. He is best known for his in-depth analysis of military conflicts, particularly the Israeli–Palestinian conflict, which a segment describes as exaggerated and as having overstated Hamas's true capabilities during Gaza War. and his appearances on news platforms particularly Al-Jazeera.

== Early life and education ==
Fayez Al-Dwairi was born on 3 March 1952 in the town of Kitim, Banī 'Obeīd District in Irbid Governorate, He attended the Jordanian Military College from 1972 to 1973 and graduated with the rank of Sub-Lieutenant. Upon his graduation, Al-Dwairi joined the Royal Jordanian Engineering Corps and participated in various missions, including a significant mine clearance operation on the Jordan–Syria border. Between 1977 and 1979, Al-Dwairi served in Yemen, where he worked with the Republic of Yemen Armed Forces as an engineering officer. During this time, he contributed to the fortification of Bab-el-Mandeb and the construction of Khaled Camp in Taiz.

In 1979, Al-Dwairi furthered his education by enrolling at Yarmouk University, where he studied business administration. His dual focus on academic achievement and military service helped him develop a comprehensive understanding of both fields.

== Military career ==
Although he has no significant combat or actual military experience, Al-Dwairi's military career spanned several decades, where he served in multiple roles that bolstered his expertise in engineering, tactics, and strategic military operations. After joining the Royal Jordanian Engineer Corps, where he spent a year. Following this, he was sent by the Jordanian General Command to Pakistan to participate in an international course at the Pakistan Command and Staff College. This experience helped broaden his strategic knowledge, allowing him to understand military tactics on an international level. Al-Dwairi participated in key military missions both domestically and abroad, often focusing on counterinsurgency operations and regional security.

Upon his return to Jordan, Al-Dwairi worked as a lecturer at the RJCSC for four years, sharing his expertise with future generations of Jordanian officers. His career then took another leap when he was appointed Director of the Royal Jordanian Engineering Corps, a prestigious position that placed him at the helm of one of Jordan's most important military divisions. Al-Dwairi eventually rose to become the commander of the Jordanian Command and Staff College, a position he held until his retirement with the rank of major general.

During his tenure, Al-Dwairi was instrumental in shaping Jordan’s military doctrine and contributed to various initiatives to modernize its armed forces. He was known for his emphasis on integrated defense systems and modern military technology, promoting reforms that allowed Jordan to better respond to regional threats.

== Strategic and Public Engagements ==
Following his retirement from active military duty, Al-Dwairi transitioned into a prominent role as a military analyst and media figure. He became a regular contributor to Al Jazeera, Sky News Arabia, and other international news outlets, offering expert analysis on conflicts ranging from the Israeli–Palestinian conflict to the wars in Iraq, Syria, and Yemen. His commentary is often sought during times of heightened regional tension, with his insights providing valuable context for global audiences.

In addition to his work as a media analyst, Al-Dwairi has authored several research papers and publications. His book, "National Security," is considered a valuable resource for understanding the security dynamics of the Middle East. He has also penned essays and opinion pieces on regional security, contributing to policy discussions in Jordan and beyond.

His popularity reached a surprising climax on 25 December 2023, during "Operation Al-Aqsa Flood" when a member of the al-Qassam Brigades mentioned him in a video. In response, Al-Dwairi expressed pride and unwavering solidarity on Al Jazeera and social media, reaffirming his commitment to the resistance cause and highlighting the honor he felt being acknowledged by the fighters in Gaza.

== Operation Al-Aqsa Flood and recognition ==
Al-Dwairi’s influence in the media grew further in 2023, particularly during the events of Operation Al-Aqsa Flood, a major military operation launched by the al-Qassam Brigades in October 2023. In a widely circulated video, a member of the al-Qassam Brigades mentioned Al-Dwairi by name.

== Works ==
- al-Duwairi, Fayez (2013). الأمن الوطني [The National Security] (in Arabic). Dar Wael For Publishing. ISBN 978-9957-91-054-9. OCLC 1103843639.
- al-Duwairi, Fayez (15 October 2018). "International Cooperation in Counter Terrorism" (PDF). Islamic Military Counter Terrorism Coalition.
