= Maru, Jordan =

Village in Irbid Governorate, Jordan

Maru Marw
- village
- Location in Jordan
- Coordinates: 32°36′33″N 35°53′27″E
- PAL: 233/223
- Country: Jordan
- Governorate: Irbid Governorate
- Time zone: UTC + 2

Maru is one of the main agricultural villages in Irbid Governorate, Jordan. It is located to the north-east of the city of Irbid, about 7 km, and had a population of about 4536 people in 2015.

== History ==
Maru is traced back to Ancient Greece, the Roman Empire and the Islamic Golden Age, and it is believed to be built on the rubble of an old Roman town. It became known for its old mosque which built of black basalt stones.

In 1596 it appeared in the Ottoman tax registers as Marw, situated in the nahiya (subdistrict) of Bani Kinana, part of the Sanjak of Hawran. It had 28 households and 15 bachelors; all Muslims. The villagers paid a fixed tax-rate of 25% on agricultural products; including wheat, barley, summer crops, goats and bee-hives, in addition to occasional revenues. The total tax was 11,250 akçe; of which the majority (7,050 akçe) came from wheat. 3/24 of the revenue went to a waqf.

In 1961 the population of Maru was 449 inhabitants.

== Geography ==
One of the capital department (Al-Qasabeh) villages, Maru is characterized by its rustic and spacious plains on the Hawran plateau, which covers northern Jordan. It is bounded to the west by villages of Beit Ras and Harima, south by Hakama, east by Mougaer and a spring of water – Rahob, and north by village of Alal.

== Landmarks ==
Maru agricultural research station was built in the 1980s to improve the agricultural situation in the governorate of Irbid, and has improved yields of crops such as wheat.

== Bibliography ==
- Government of Jordan, Department of Statistics (1964). First Census of Population and Housing. Volume I: Final Tables; General Characteristics of the Population (PDF).
- Hütteroth, W.-D.; Abdulfattah, K. (1977). Historical Geography of Palestine, Transjordan and Southern Syria in the Late 16th Century. Erlanger Geographische Arbeiten, Sonderband 5. Erlangen, Germany: Vorstand der Fränkischen Geographischen Gesellschaft. ISBN 3-920405-41-2.
