= Bushra, Jordan =

Bushra (Bishra) بشرى
- Village
- Location in Jordan
- Coordinates: 32°33′N 35°54′E
- PAL: 234/218
- Country: Jordan
- Province: Irbid Governorate

Population (2015)
  - Total: 19,444
- Time zone: UTC+2 (EET)
  - Summer (DST): UTC+3 (EEST)

Bushra (Bishra) is a town in the Irbid Governorate, Jordan. It rises 560 metres (1,840 ft) above sea level. It is located East of the municipality and town of Irbid 3 km, to the North by the towns of Hakama and Beit Ras (Roman kabitalios), to the South by the town of Huwwarah and to the East by the town of Sal.

== Geography ==
The town is part of Hauran. The red soils of the region are very fertile land for growing grain. The town is on a small hill called Tal - Mehrez, southern valley. The valley of the Alroish ends in the Rahaub Valley, which empties in the Yarmouk River.

Area soils are white gray, and the region contains some caves, some of which are spread around the Grand Mosque, which was demolished after the male secondary school building in 1986. The territory divides into thirteen basins, including Aargom blacks, Doghaim, cave, door, Alborea, fronting, busia, giadp, corsage, broadcloth, Alden, slick and Baydar.

== History ==
In 1596, during the Ottoman Empire, Bushra was noted (under the name of Bisri) in the census as being located in the nahiya of Bani Juhma in the Liwa of Hawran, with a population of 12 households and 5 bachelors; all Muslim. The villagers paid a fixed tax-rate of 25% on various agricultural products, including wheat, barley, summer crops, goats and beehives, in addition to occasional revenues; a total of 4,876 akçe. 1/4 of the revenue went to a waqf.

In 1838 Bushra was reported to be in ruins.

== Population ==
In 1961 the population of Bushra was 1,560 inhabitants; 768 males and 792 females. By 2005, the population had grown to 11,996, in which 6,150 were male and 5,642 were female. More recently in 2015, the population was 19,444 inhabitants with 9,568 female and 9,876 male, mostly all of the people there are Muslims. Bushra supports a population of minority Christians, who have roots in the town for more than 130 years.

== Volunteer work ==
Bushra youth volunteer work - an independent group of its youth who have volunteered to serve their town and advancement at all levels and in various fields. Projects include:

1. Cleaning the streets and sidewalks and the mosques of the town, and planting areas and exploited optimally.
2. Increase awareness among school and university students and townspeople of the importance of public ownership.
3. Campaigns and support healthy of rhyme and sports projects in the town.

== Bibliography ==
- Government of Jordan, Department of Statistics (1964). First Census of Population and Housing. Volume I: Final Tables; General Characteristics of the Population (PDF).
- Hütteroth, W.-D.; Abdulfattah, K. (1977). Historical Geography of Palestine, Transjordan and Southern Syria in the Late 16th Century. Erlanger Geographische Arbeiten, Sonderband 5. Erlangen, Germany: Vorstand der Fränkischen Geographischen Gesellschaft. ISBN 3-920405-41-2.
- Robinson, E.; Smith, E. (1841). Biblical Researches in Palestine, Mount Sinai and Arabia Petraea: A Journal of Travels in the year 1838. Vol. 3. Boston: Crocker & Brewster.
