= Banī Kenānah =

Governorate of Jordan

- District
- Country: Jordan
- Governorate: Irbid
- Time zone: GMT +2
  - Summer (DST): +3

Banī Kenānah (Arabic: بني كنانة) is one of the districts of Irbid governorate, Jordan.
