= Natifah =

Natifah ناطفة (إربد)
- Town
- Location in Jordan
- Coordinates: 32°31′09″N 35°49′19″E
- PAL: 227/213
- Country: Jordan
- Governorate: Irbid Governorate
- Time zone: UTC + 2

Natifah is a village in Jordan approximately 2 km south-west of Irbid.

== History ==
In 1596 it appeared in the Ottoman tax registers named as Natifa, situated in the nahiya (subdistrict) of Bani al-Asar, part of the Sanjak of Hawran. It had 17 households and 9 bachelors; all Muslim. The villagers paid a fixed tax-rate of 25% on agricultural products; including wheat, barley, summer crops, vineyards/fruit trees, goats and bee-hives. The total tax was 5,500 akçe.

In 1838 Natifah's inhabitants were predominantly Sunni Muslims.

The Jordanian census of 1961 found 451 inhabitants in Natifa.

== Bibliography ==
- Government of Jordan, Department of Statistics (1964). First Census of Population and Housing. Volume I: Final Tables; General Characteristics of the Population (PDF).
- Hütteroth, W.-D.; Abdulfattah, K. (1977). Historical Geography of Palestine, Transjordan and Southern Syria in the Late 16th Century. Erlanger Geographische Arbeiten, Sonderband 5. Erlangen, Germany: Vorstand der Fränkischen Geographischen Gesellschaft. ISBN 3-920405-41-2.
- Robinson, E.; Smith, E. (1841). Biblical Researches in Palestine, Mount Sinai and Arabia Petraea: A Journal of Travels in the year 1838. Vol. 3. Boston: Crocker & Brewster.
