= Johfiyeh =

Johfiyeh جُحْفِيَّة
- Village
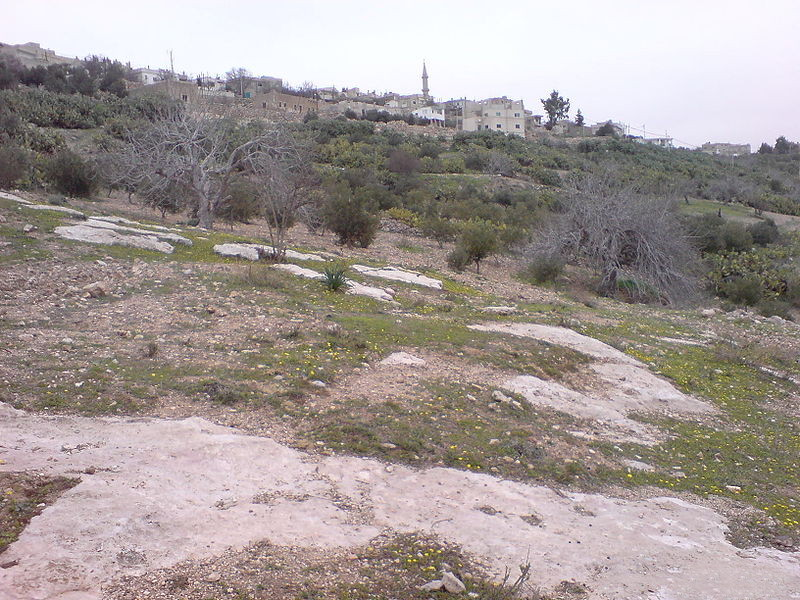

- Location within Jordan
- Coordinates: 32°29′21″N 35°49′35″E
- PAL: 227/211
- Country: Jordan
- Province: Irbid Governorate
- Established: 3000 B.C.

Government
  - Type: Municipality
  - Mayor: Yahya Ibrahim Telfah

Area
  - Metro: 4 km^{2} (1.5 sq mi)
- Elevation: 794 m (2,605 ft)

Population (2015)
  - Village: 4,251
- Time zone: GMT +2
  - Summer (DST): +3
- Area code: +(962)2
- Website: www.irbid.gov.jo

Johfiyeh (Arabic: جُحفية) also spelled Johfiyah, Juhfiyah or Juhfiyeh, is a historical village in northern Jordan, located 80 kilometers north of the capital Amman and about 7.5 km southwest of the city Irbid. It had a population of 4251 and the most populated family is Talafha.

At the northern edge of the modern village is the archaeological site of Tell Johfiyeh with several more related sites, showing two main phases of settlement: Iron Age II and Byzantine-Umayyad.

== Location ==
Johfiyeh has located about 80 km to the north of the Jordanian capital Amman and 7.5 km southwest of Irbid. It is part of the Hauran plains which extend from southern Syria to the north of Jordan. From Johfiyeh, one can see the disputed Jordanian, Syrian and Israeli triangle of borders (tripoint). In winter, Mount Hermon, which is located in Lebanon and Syria, can be seen clearly.

== Topography ==
Johfiyeh lies on a plateau elevated around 750 to 793 meters above sea level. The decline of the hills gradually hand Johfiyeh in a horizontal line that stretches to less than one kilometer to Hauran plains, which lies at about 400 meters above sea level. Both the western and southern slopes of the hills suffer from soil erosion as a result of rainfall, which over time led to the loss of vegetation in these areas except for some shrubs and wild herbs found standing between the cracks in the rocks. Among these herbs are thyme and buckthorn. The case is different when heading east, where the plateau begins to become less steppelike and the layer of soil is thicker, dark red and fertile. This soil is often mixed with ashes of ancient ovens which are the remains of civilizations that have followed on in the area.

In the western side, Wadi ("valley") Al-Joroon is the natural separation between Deir Yousef and Johfiyeh, it separates it from Al-Mazar also. From the north, it is the natural Wadi Al-Ghafar which separates Johfiyeh from Irbid.

== History ==
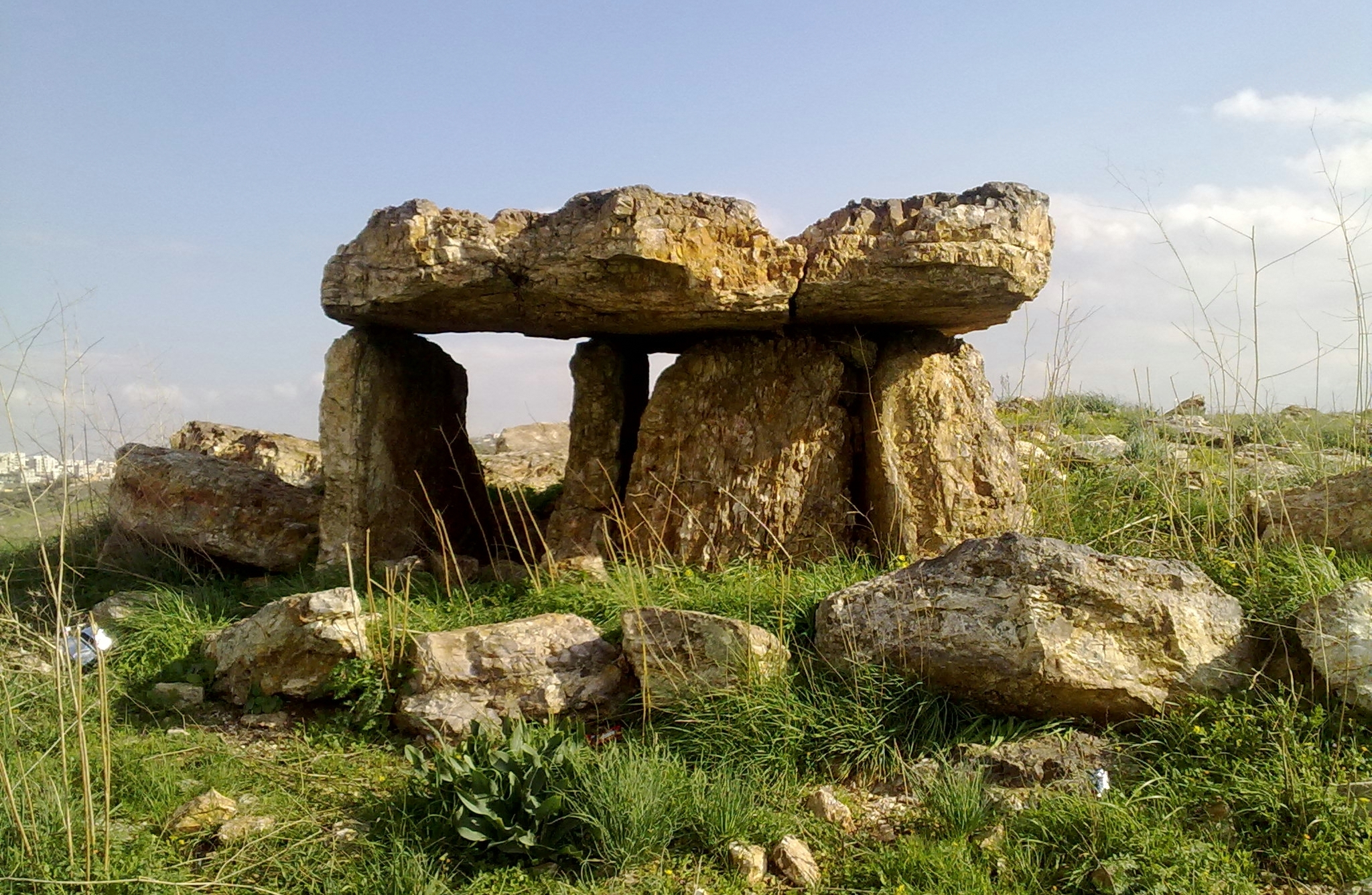
Flint dolmen in Johfiyeh.

The small village Johfiyeh has been thriving from the Stone Age until the Ottoman Empire, it was one of the largest urban and population centers until the advent of the ten Roman fortified cities of Decapolis in the Roman era. It is believed that most of its historic ruins and buildings collapsed after the earthquake which hit the region in 747 AD and the earthquakes that followed.

Johfiyeh strategically located on a hill overseeing the mountainous Hauran plains, overlooking the Golan Heights and Mount Hermon and the Sea of Galilee, and overlooking the beginning of the mountains of Ajloun to the south. It is what gave it its importance through the ages.

"Jehvip" originated in the Stone Age, as evidenced by surveys and archaeological discoveries. It flourished in the Iron Age and the Bronze Age as evidenced by late artifacts found in the Tell Johfiyeh. Johfiyeh is found in Greek inscriptions, as well as remains of marble and pottery belonging to the Hellenistic era and the beginning of the Roman era, which indicates the prosperity of it during that era.

It continued prosperous and was one of the Romanian colonies as evidenced by the archeological findings like sculptures, coins and pottery found in the site of Tell Johfiyeh.

Johfiyeh is believed to have been a shelter, during the period of the Byzantines, for those who had converted to Christianity. This is clear from the monuments like the Byzantine church, which dates back to the sixth century AD, besides the distinctive floor mosaic color and the remnants of the lime. This not mentioning the Byzantine cemetery that extends from the western site of the ancient church until "Karm-At'toot" berries garden to the south of the current Uthman ibn Affan mosque.

During the Umayyad Caliphate, Johfiyeh was of great importance for the rulers, for it is believed that the Umayyad rulers were visiting Johfiyeh for hunting and to enjoy the beauty of nature. A lot of glassware and pottery belonging to the Umayyad era has been found.

Johfiyeh began to lose its importance after transferring center of the Islamic caliphate to Baghdad, as most towns in the Syria region (Sham). However, Johfiyeh is mentioned in the Ottoman tax records, which means it continued to be inhabited and cultivated during that time and up till today.

In 1596 it appeared in the Ottoman tax registers named as Juhfiyya, situated in the nahiya (subdistrict) of Bani al-Asar, part of the Sanjak of Hawran. It had 40 households and 21 bachelors; all Muslim. The villagers paid a fixed tax-rate of 25% on agricultural products; including wheat, barley, summer crops, vineyards/fruit trees, goats and bee-hives. The total tax was 5,999 akçe.

In 1838, Johfiyeh's inhabitants were predominantly Sunni Muslims and Greek Christians.

In 1961, the population of Johfiyeh was 349 inhabitants.

== Monuments and archaeological sites ==
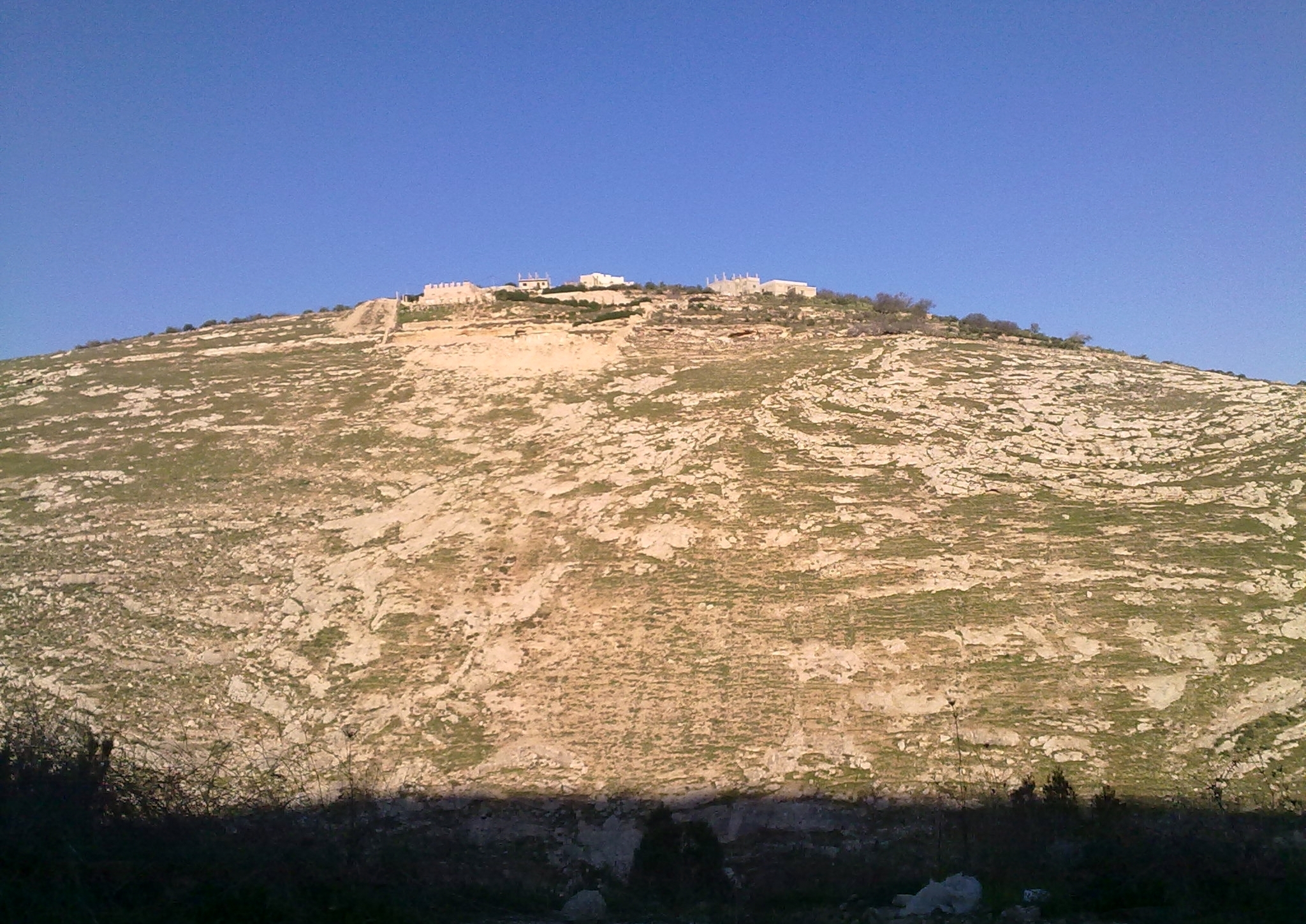
Flint dolmen in Johfiyeh.

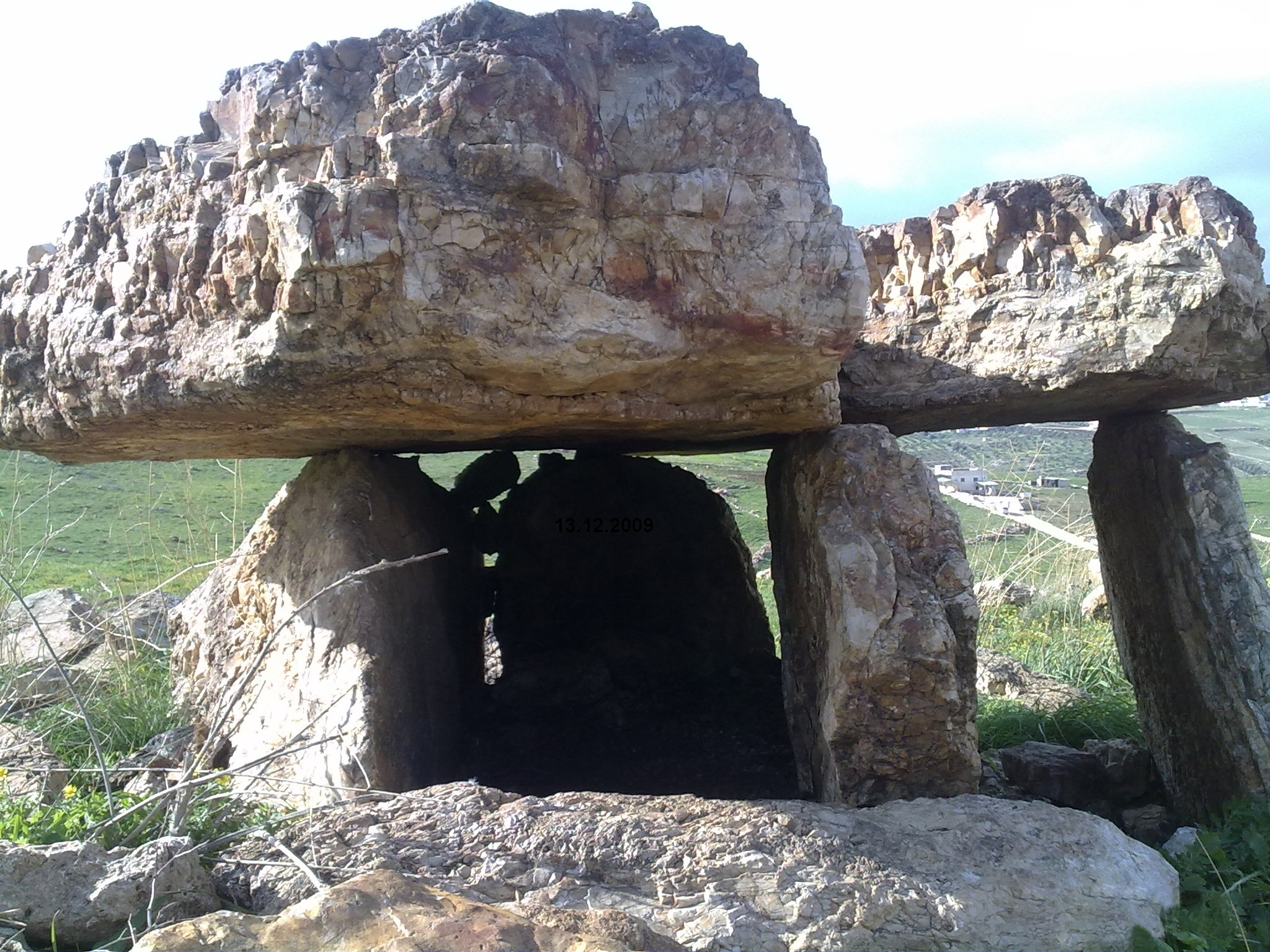
Flint dolmen in Johfiyeh.

- Tell Johfiyeh
- The Old Mosque
- The Byzantine Church
- Dolmens: There are many examples of flint dolmens in village of Johfiyeh and Natifah in northern Jordan
- Assieh
- Al Bateen
- Kherbet Hufa
- Umisrareh
- Rojmelaries

== Economy ==
The people of Johfiyeh mainly depend on cultivating their lands with wheat, barley, beans, chickpeas and occasionally corn and sesame. The village is well known for cultivating tomatoes, okra, wild cucumber (Faggos), zucchini and pumpkins. All depend on rain for irrigation.

Some fig trees and olive trees besides the famous cactus are another natural support for income of Johfiyeh.

A high percentage of the young generation (born after 1965) have gained higher education at university levels and are employed in different governmental institutions. Many are employed in the army as well.

== Bibliography ==
- Government of Jordan, Department of Statistics (1964). First Census of Population and Housing. Volume I: Final Tables; General Characteristics of the Population (PDF).
- Hütteroth, W.-D.; Abdulfattah, K. (1977). Historical Geography of Palestine, Transjordan and Southern Syria in the Late 16th Century. Erlanger Geographische Arbeiten, Sonderband 5. Erlangen, Germany: Vorstand der Fränkischen Geographischen Gesellschaft. ISBN 3-920405-41-2.
- Robinson, E.; Smith, E. (1841). Biblical Researches in Palestine, Mount Sinai and Arabia Petraea: A Journal of Travels in the year 1838. Vol. 3. Boston: Crocker & Brewster.
