= Al-Mazar al-Shamali =

Al Mazar al Shamali المزار الشمالي
- City
- Location in Jordan
- Coordinates: 32°28′21″N 35°47′34″E
- PAL: 224/208
- Country: Jordan
- Governorate: Irbid Governorate

Population
  - Estimate: 16,000 - 20,000
- Time zone: UTC + 2

Al-Mazar Al-Shamali (Arabic: المزار الشمالي) is a city located in the Irbid Governorate of north-western Jordan. It's the capital city of Al Mazar al Shamali District, which is one of the nine districts that constitute the Irbid Governorate of Jordan. It has a population of approximately 20,000 people with the major clans being Al-Jarrah and Al-Shorman.

== Vegetation and agriculture ==
The region consists of a series of mountain ranges that reach approximately 780 meters above sea level. It's has sub-humid Mediterranean biome with hot/dry summers and mild/wet winters, which supports many tree species in the southern forested region, such as oak, pistacia, and pine. Lush shrublands are found in other less forested regions.

The region produces many basic crops: wheat, barley, and fruit trees such as peach, apricot, and almond. Olives are one of the most important products in the region, in addition to grapes.

== History ==
Al-Mazar Al-Shamali is known to have been an inhabited area during the Iron Age, as well as the Roman, Byzantine, Mamluk, and later Islamic periods. It is mentioned that at the beginning of Ottoman rule, the area was known as Bani Al-A‘sar Subdistrict (Nahiya). By the end of the sixteenth century, it became known as Bani Atiyah Subdistrict, and at the beginning of the nineteenth century it came to be known as Bani Ubaid Subdistrict.

It was given the name Al-Mazar (Shrine), because it served as a stopping point for visitors due to the presence of a number of prophets’ shrines with the old pilgrimage site found at the place of Prophet Dawood (Prophet David) being the most famous, and Al-Shamali (The Northern), which was added to distinguish it with Al-Mazar al-Janubi (The Southern Shrine).

The district (Liwa) of Al Mazar al Shamali was established in 1996.

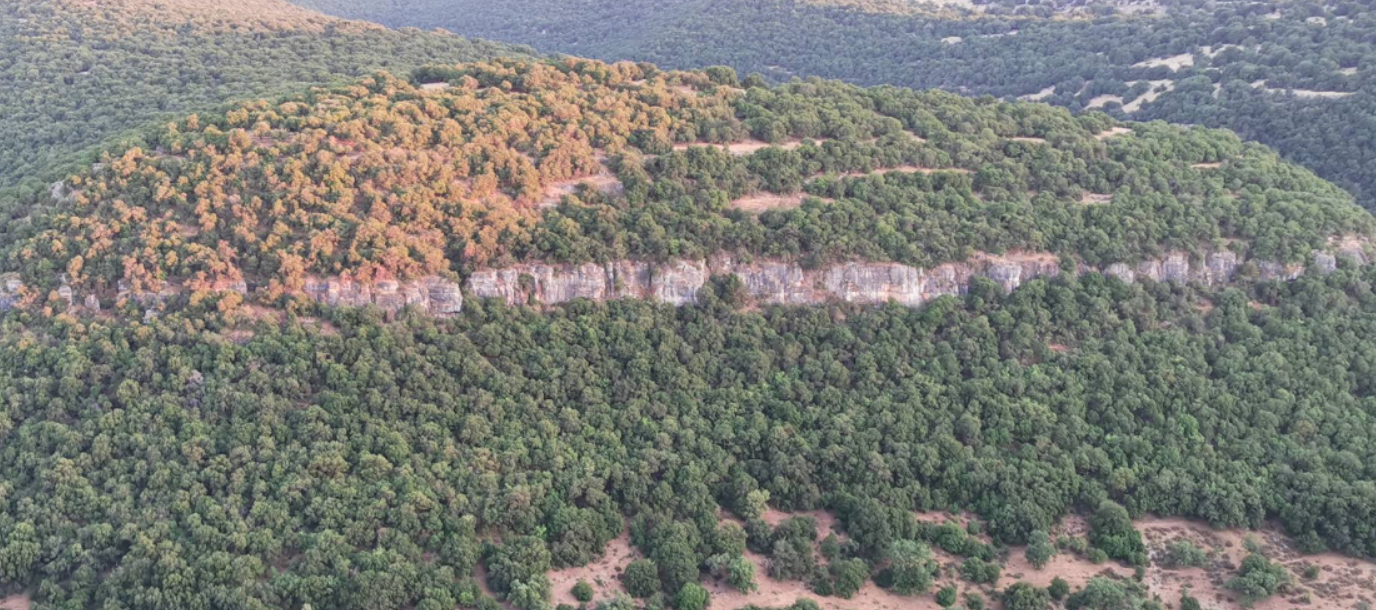
English: طور الطبل (known locally as عراق أبو الطبل), which can be translated into Mount al-Ṭabl, is a well-known lookout rocky hill found between Inbah and Al-Mazar
