= Qaṣabah Irbid =

Governorate of Jordan

Qaṣabah Irbid قصبة إربد
- District
- Location within Jordan
- Country: Jordan
- Governorate: Irbid

Area
  - Total: 235.8 km^{2} (91.0 sq mi)

Population (2015)
  - Total: 739,212
  - Density: 3,135/km^{2} (8,119/sq mi)
- Time zone: GMT +2
  - Summer (DST): +3

Qaṣabah Irbid is one of the districts of Irbid governorate, Jordan.
