= Zoubia =

Zoubia زوبيا (إربد) Zubia, Zubya
- village
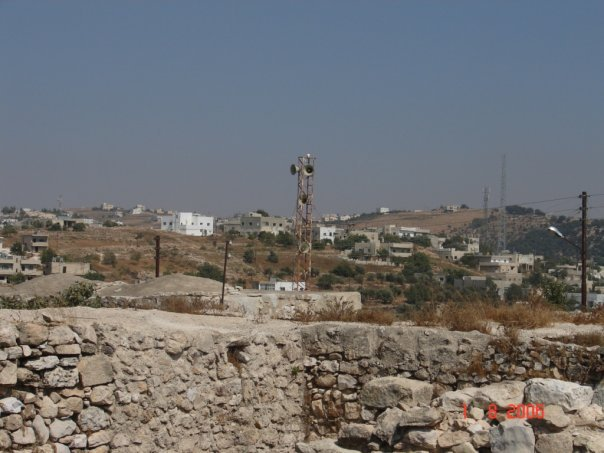
- Zoubia, 2012

- Location in Jordan
- Coordinates: 32°25′50″N 35°46′30″E
- Grid position: 223/204
- Country: Jordan
- Governorate: Irbid Governorate

Population
  - Total: 7,000
- Time zone: UTC + 2

Zoubia (alternate spelling Zubia or Zubya) is a village in Jordan with a population of around 7,000. It is located in northwestern Jordan and is part of the Irbid Governorate. Zoubia is known for its abundant oak forests and its mountains, which are considered the highest in Irbid.

For most of known history, Zoubians worked in agriculture. Chief crops included olives, grapes and figs, while some farmers focused on seasonal crops such as wheat, barley, lentils and tomatoes. The villagers also used to raise cattle, sheep and horses.

Nowadays, the majority of the population have taken on other jobs to live, leaving very few to work in agriculture.

== History ==
In 1596 it appeared in the Ottoman tax registers named as Zubiya, situated in the nahiya (subdistrict) of Kura, part of the Sanjak of Ajlun. It had 14 households and 6 bachelors; all Muslim; and 7 Christian households. The villagers paid a fixed tax-rate of 25% on agricultural products; including wheat, barley, olive trees, goats and bee-hives, in addition to occasional revenues. The total tax was 8,200 akçe.

The Jordanian census of 1961 found 586 inhabitants in Zubiya.

== Tourist destinations ==
Zoubia is home to several tourist destinations. The Zoubia Natural Reserve consists of rolling hills in a Mediterranean climate, covered in evergreen oaks, as well as strawberry and pistachio trees, among others. Fallow deer, mountain gazelles, stone martens, jackals, red foxes, striped hyenas, Persian squirrels, porcupines, wild boars, mountain hares, and wolves inhabit this area. Zoubia cave is about 3 km^{2}, and it is internally surrounded by stalagmite and stalactite columns. There is an old spring in one of Zoubia's valleys, which residents used to consider their only source for drinking water and for watering their livestock.

The Old Village is located on the slope of a high mountain, and contains traces of old houses and castles that were left by Byzantine, Roman, Umayyad, and Ottoman civilizations.

== Bibliography ==
- Government of Jordan, Department of Statistics (1964). First Census of Population and Housing. Volume I: Final Tables; General Characteristics of the Population (PDF).
- Hütteroth, W.-D.; Abdulfattah, K. (1977). Historical Geography of Palestine, Transjordan and Southern Syria in the Late 16th Century. Erlanger Geographische Arbeiten, Sonderband 5. Erlangen, Germany: Vorstand der Fränkischen Geographischen Gesellschaft. ISBN 3-920405-41-2.
