= Al-Mazār ash-Shamālī =

Governorate of Jordan

Coordinates: 32.4725°N 35.7928°E

Al-Mazār ash-Shamālī المزار الشمالي
- District
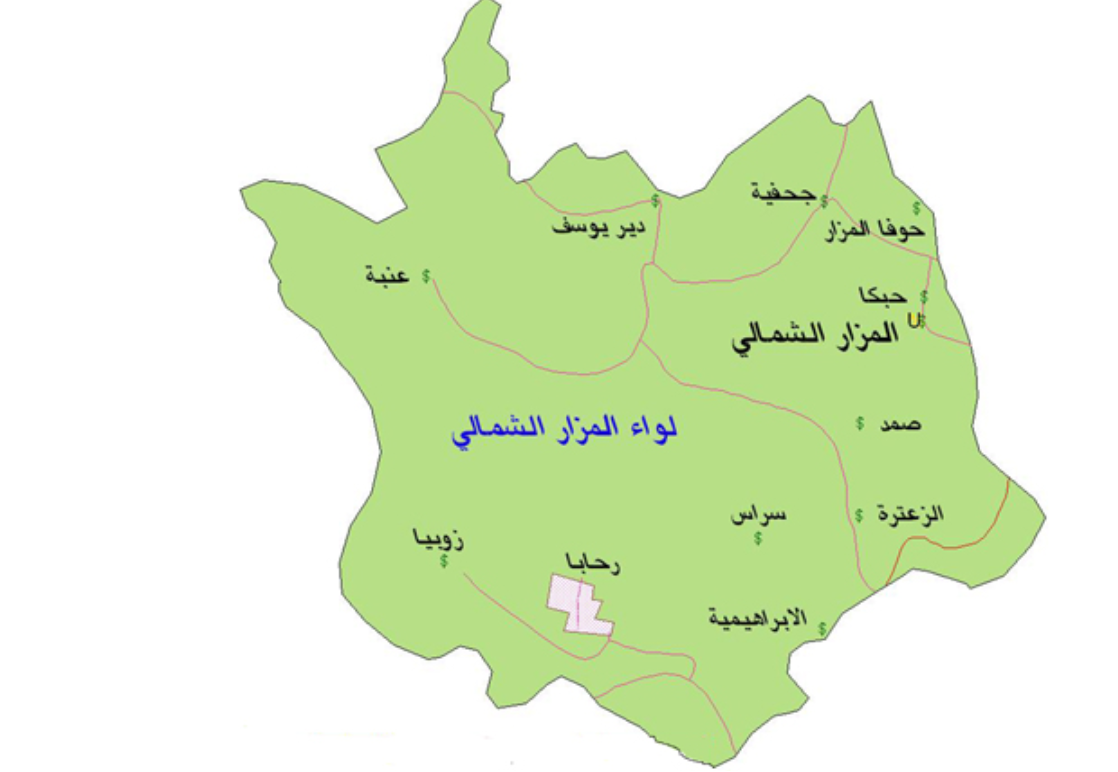
- خريطة المزار
- Interactive map of Al-Mazār ash-Shamālī
- Country: Jordan
- Governorate: Irbid

Area
  - Total: 86.19 km^{2} (33.28 sq mi)

Population (2015 census)
  - Total: 78,427
  - Density: 909.9/km^{2} (2,357/sq mi)
- Time zone: GMT +2
  - Summer (DST): +3

Al-Mazār ash-Shamālī is one of the nine districts of Irbid governorate, Jordan. Its capital city is Al-Mazār ash-Shamālī.
