= Banī 'Obeīd =

Governorate of Jordan

- District
- Location within Jordan
- Country: Jordan
- Governorate: Irbid

Area
  - Total: 188.4 km^{2} (72.7 sq mi)

Population (2015 census)
  - Total: 204,313
  - Density: 1,084/km^{2} (2,809/sq mi)
- Time zone: GMT +2
  - Summer (DST): +3

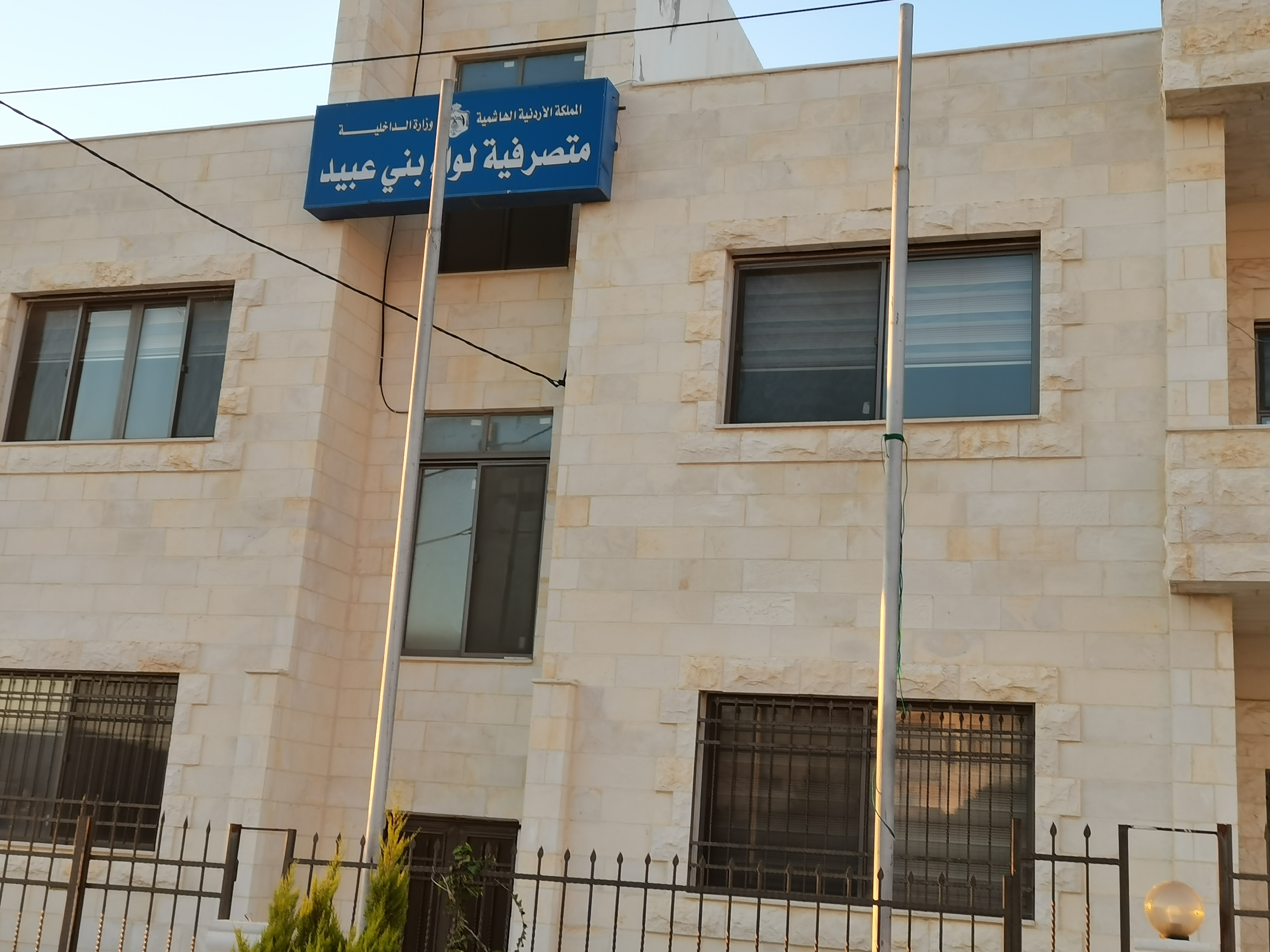
Bani Obaid District Governorate

Banī 'Obeīd (Arabic: بني عبيد) is one of the districts of Irbid governorate, Jordan.
