= Al-Wasṭīyah =

Governorate of Jordan

Coordinates: 32.58805°N 35.70469°E

Al-Wasṭīyah الوسطية
- District
- Interactive map of Al-Wasṭīyah
- Country: Jordan
- Governorate: Irbid

Area
  - Total: 45.78 km^{2} (17.68 sq mi)

Population (2015 census)
  - Total: 42,571
  - Density: 929.9/km^{2} (2,408/sq mi)
- Time zone: GMT +2
  - Summer (DST): +3

Al-Wasṭīyah is one of the districts of Irbid governorate, Jordan.
