= Samma, Jordan =

Samma صما
- Village
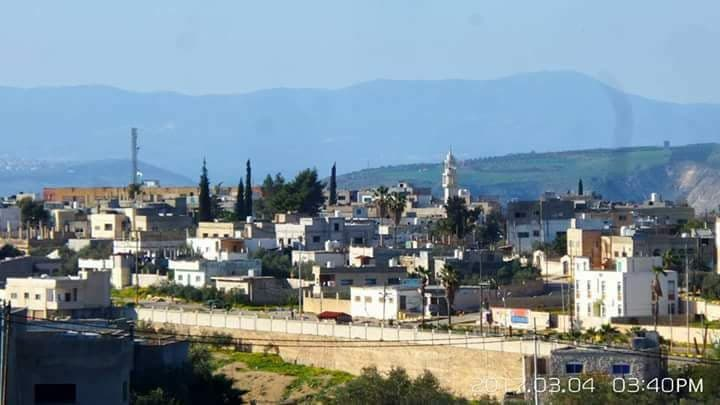

- Location in Jordan
- Coordinates: 32°34′12″N 35°41′24″E
- PAL: 215/219
- Country: Jordan
- Province: Irbid Governorate
- Department: Al-Taybeh

Area
  - Total: 13.76 km^{2} (5.31 sq mi)
- Elevation: 325 m (1,066 ft)

Population (2022)
  - Total: 18,659
- Time zone: UTC+2 (EET)
  - Summer (DST): UTC+3 (EEST)
- Postal code: 21892
- Area code: +(962)2
- Geocode: 247015
- Website: www.irbid.gov.jo

Samma (Arabic: صمّا) is a village in northern Jordan, located 80 kilometers north of the capital Amman and about 18 km West of the city Irbid. It is perched on a hilltop 325 metres (1,066 ft) above sea level overlooking Jordan Valley and the Sea of Tiberias.

It lies in the Al-Taybeh Department that is one of the nine departments that constitute the Irbid Governorate, It covers 13.76 km^{2} and has a population of 15761 people (as of 2015).

== History ==
In 1596 it appeared in the Ottoman tax registers named as Samma, situated in the nahiya (subdistrict) of Bani Kinana, part of the Sanjak of Hawran. It had 19 households and 13 bachelors; all Muslim. The villagers paid a fixed tax-rate of 25% on agricultural products; including wheat, barley, summer crops, olive trees/fruit trees, goats and bee-hives; in addition to occasional revenues. The total tax was 4,000 akçe.

In 1838 Samma's inhabitants were predominantly Sunni Muslims and Greek Christians.

In 1885, Gottlieb Schumacher visited the village and wrote about it in his book "Northern Ajlun within the Decapolis":

Samma a large and well built village, containing 55 huts, mostly built of stone, with a population of over 300 souls, The people arc friendly to strangers, Many ancient cisterns are kept carefully cleaned, and contain sufficient rain water for the supply of the village. Some olive groves, tobacco gardens, and rows of bee-hives are seen in the vicinity, The ancient remains are of little importance, West of the village the ruined Mohammedan Weli er-Refa is pointed out.

In 1961 the population of Samma was 1,649 inhabitants.

== Population ==
Depending on The Population and Housing Census report released in late February 2016:

- Population: 15761
- Male: 8048
- Female: 7713
- Families: 3113

== Gallery ==
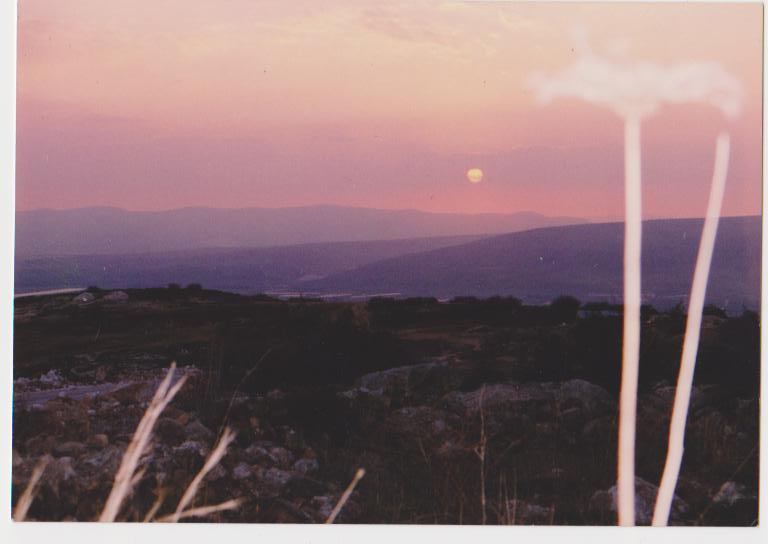

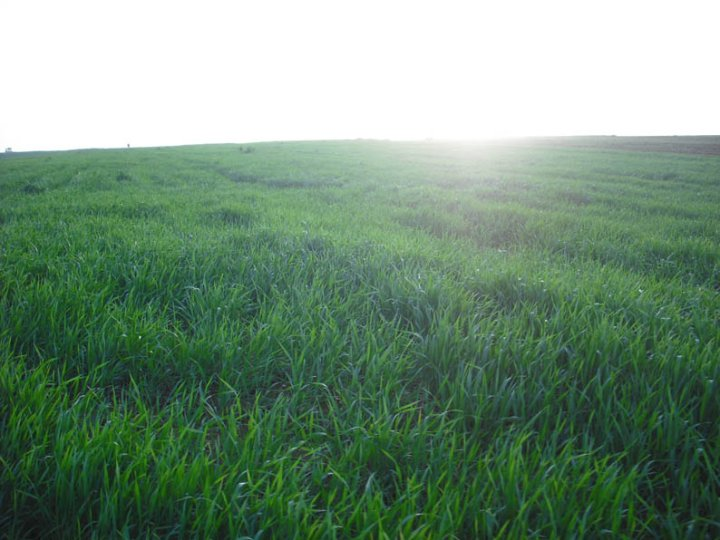

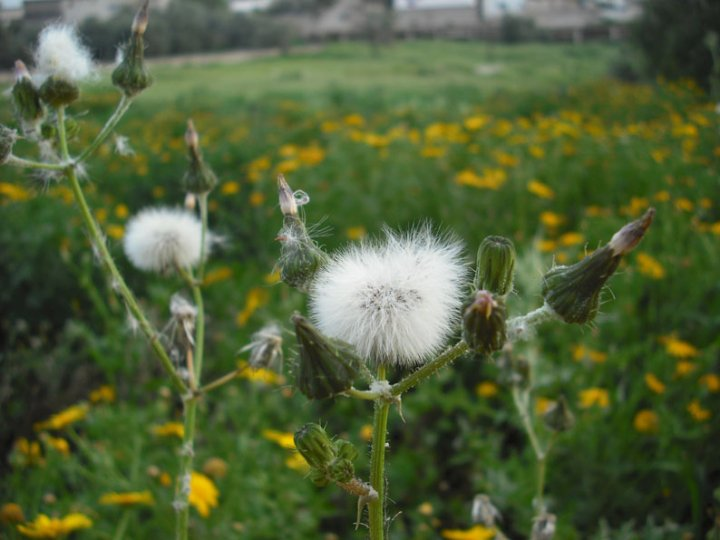

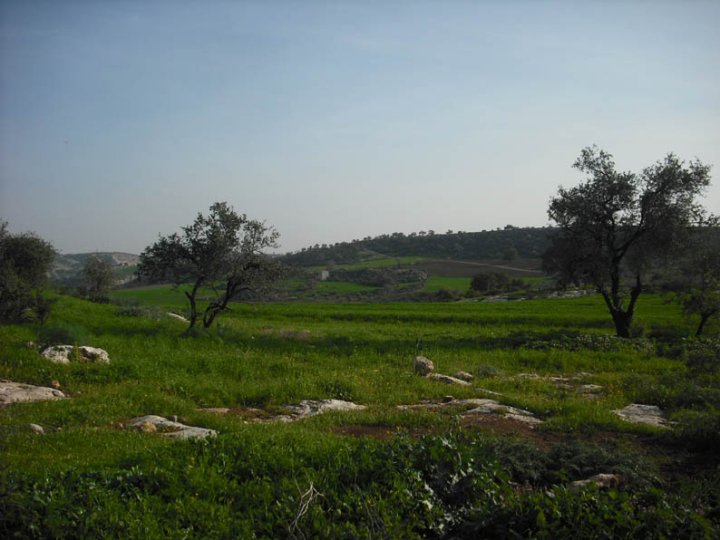

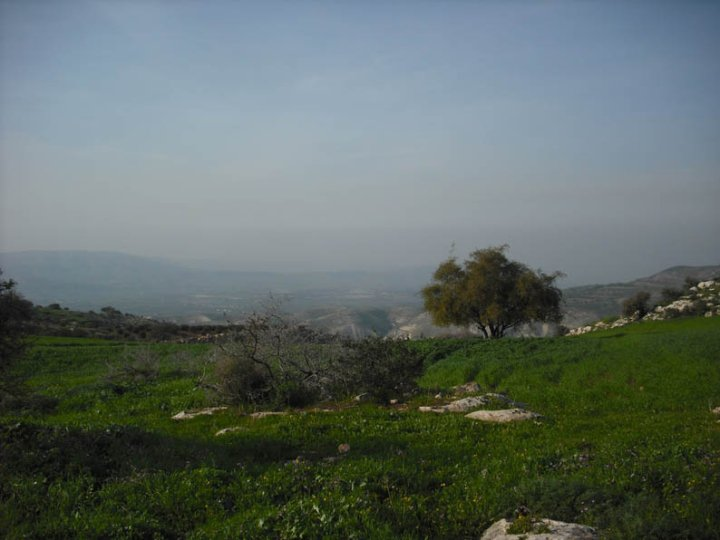

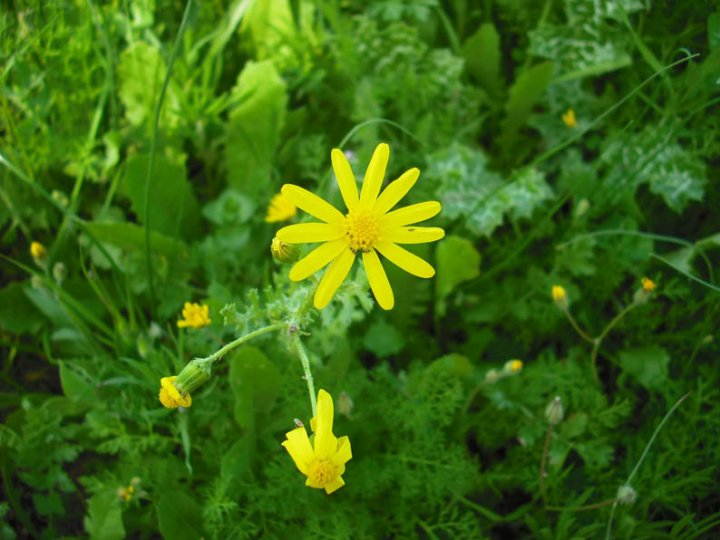

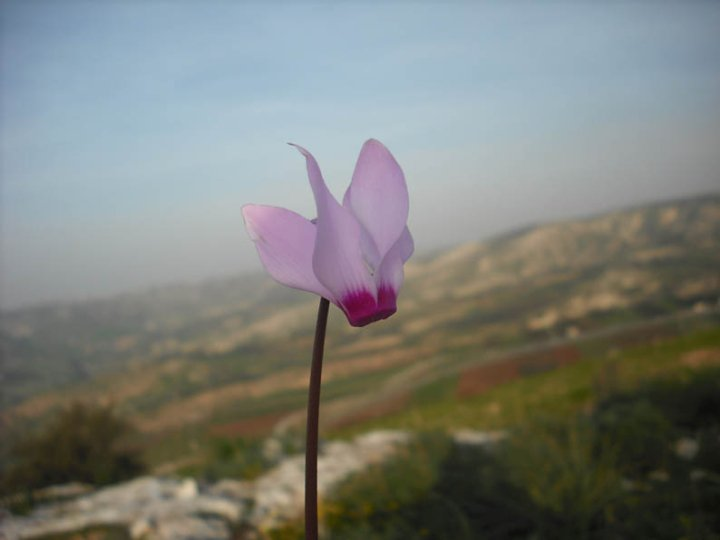

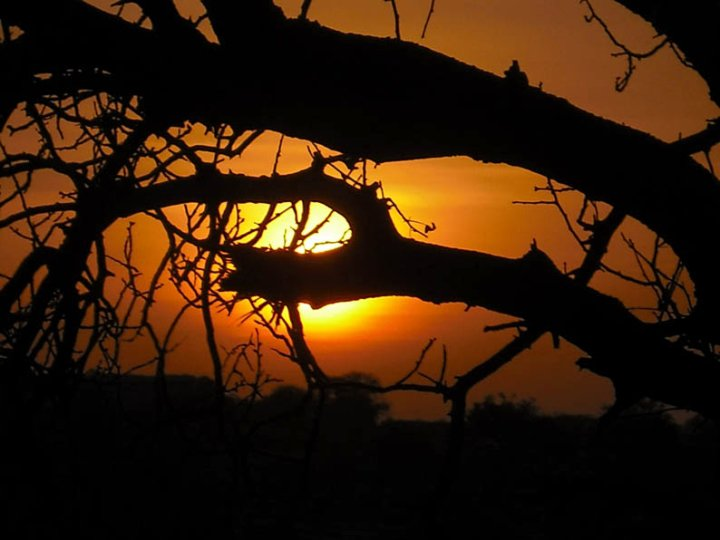

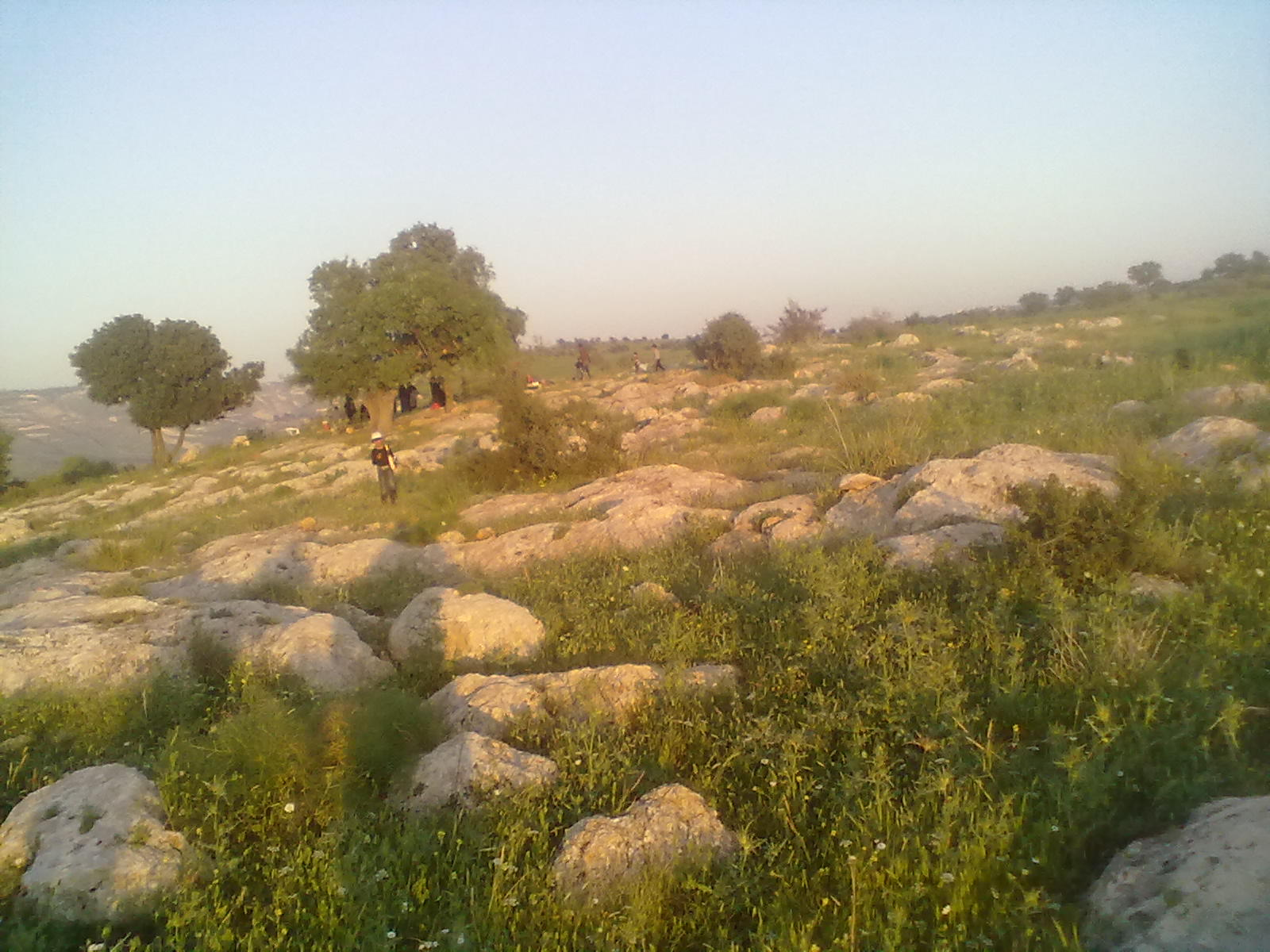

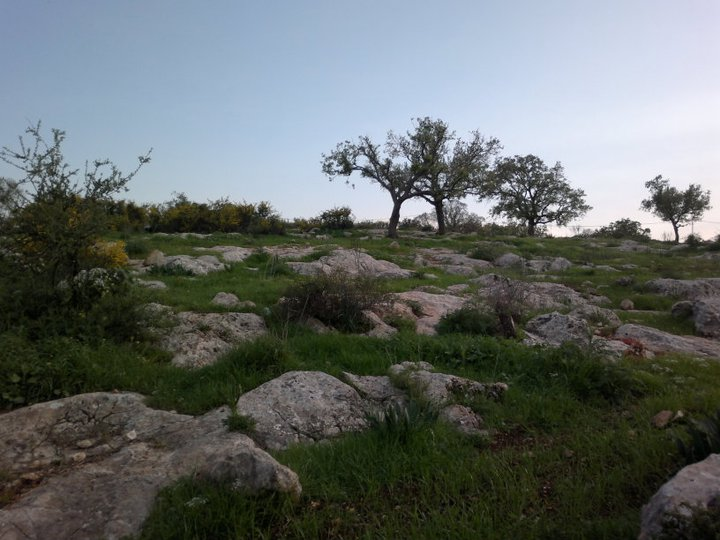

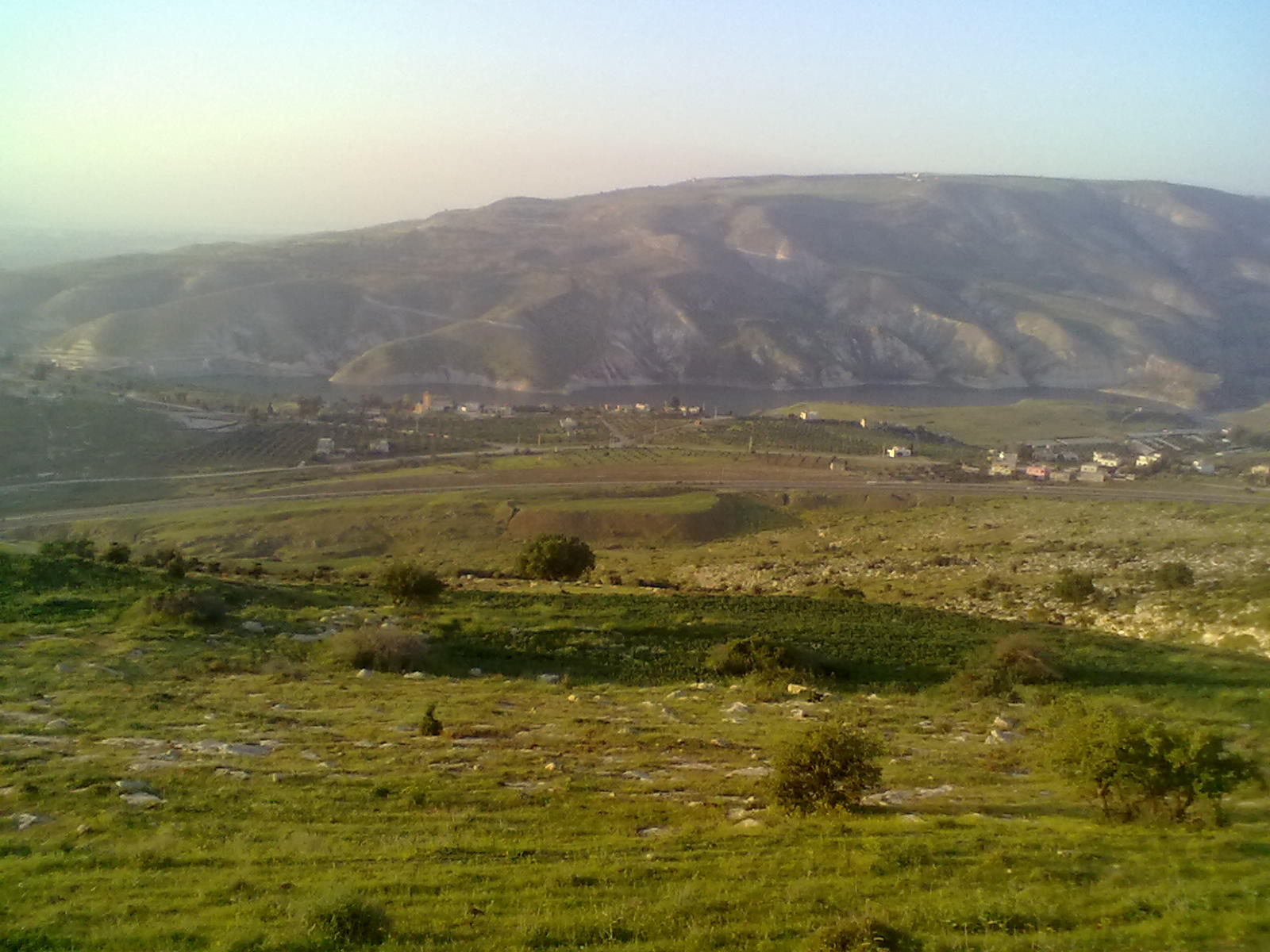

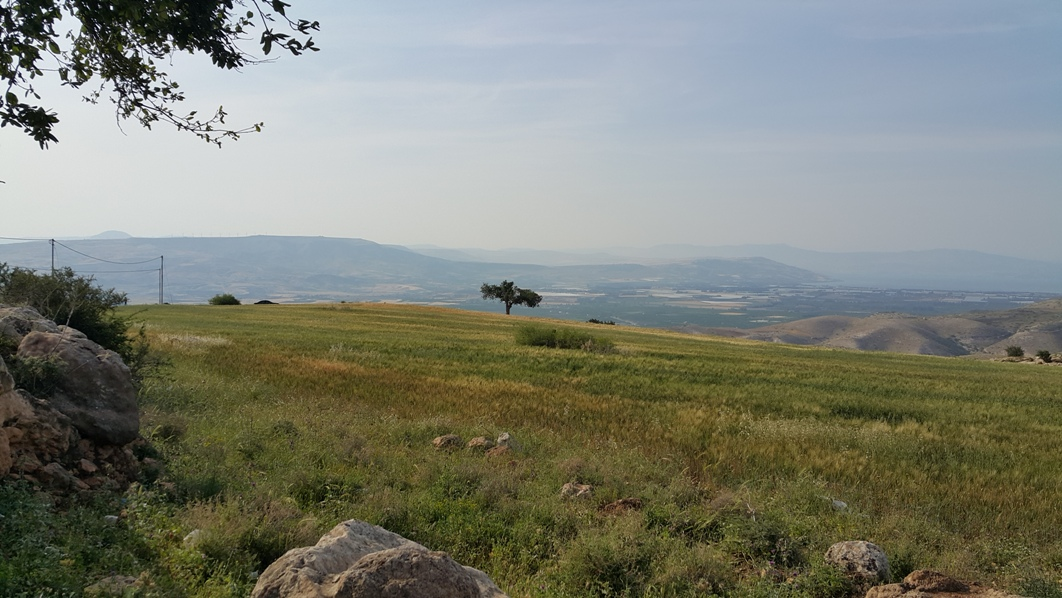

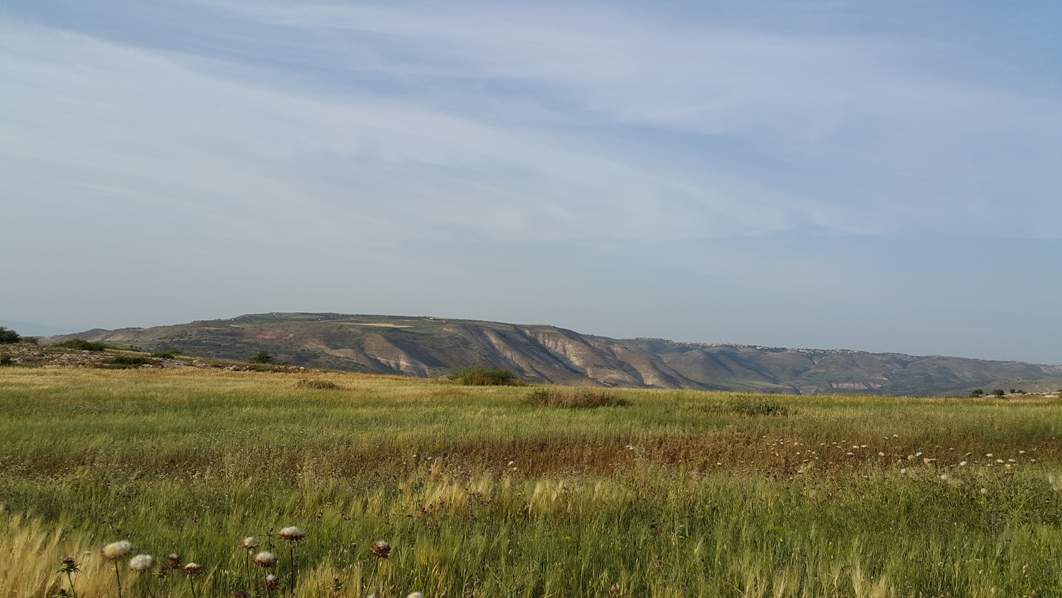

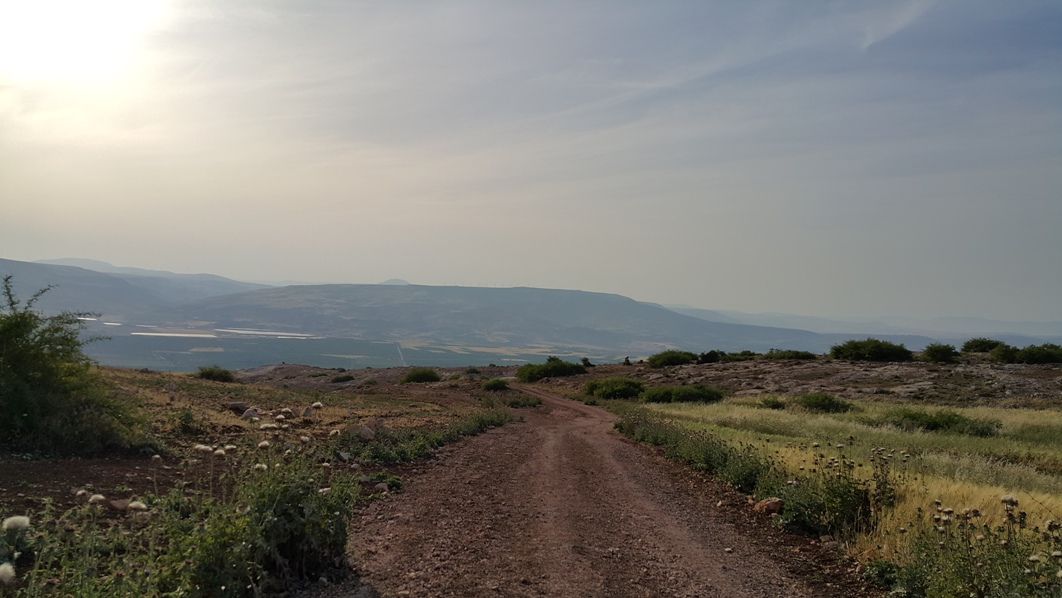

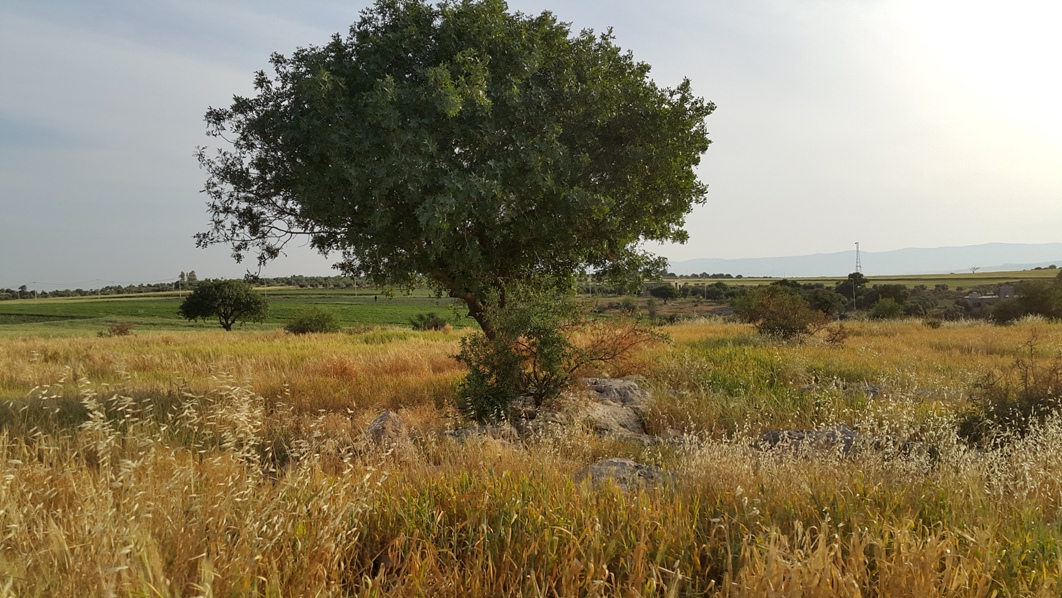

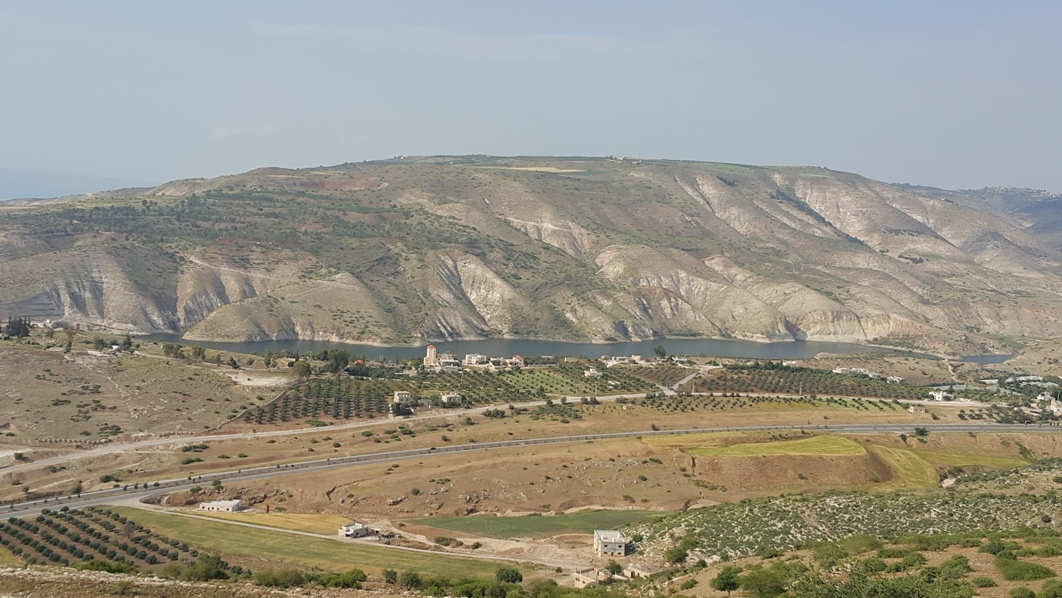

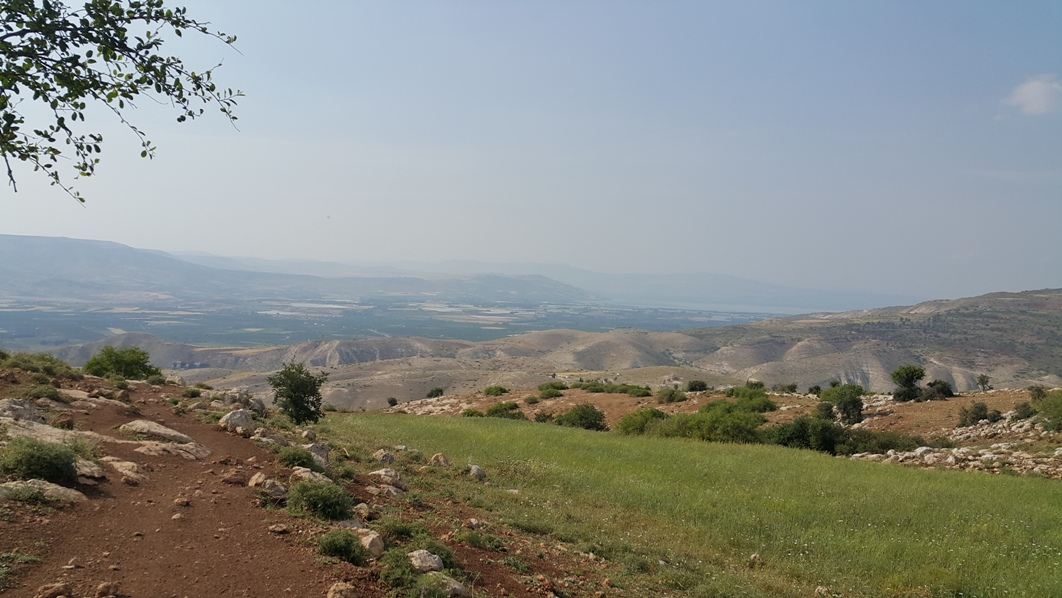

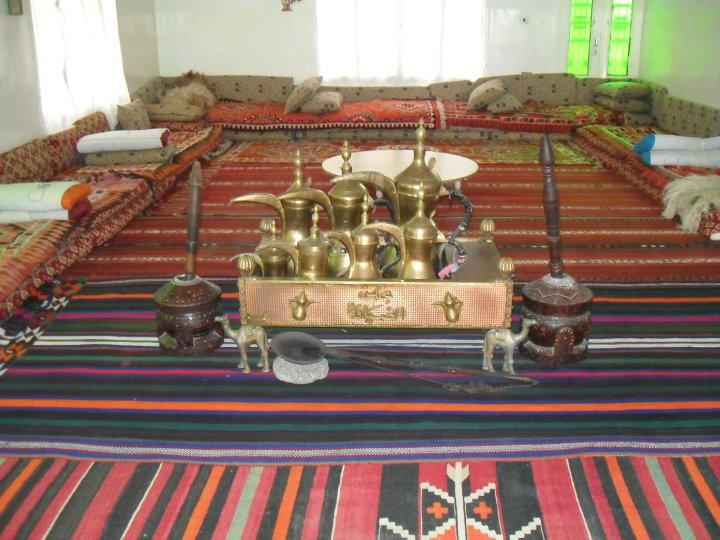

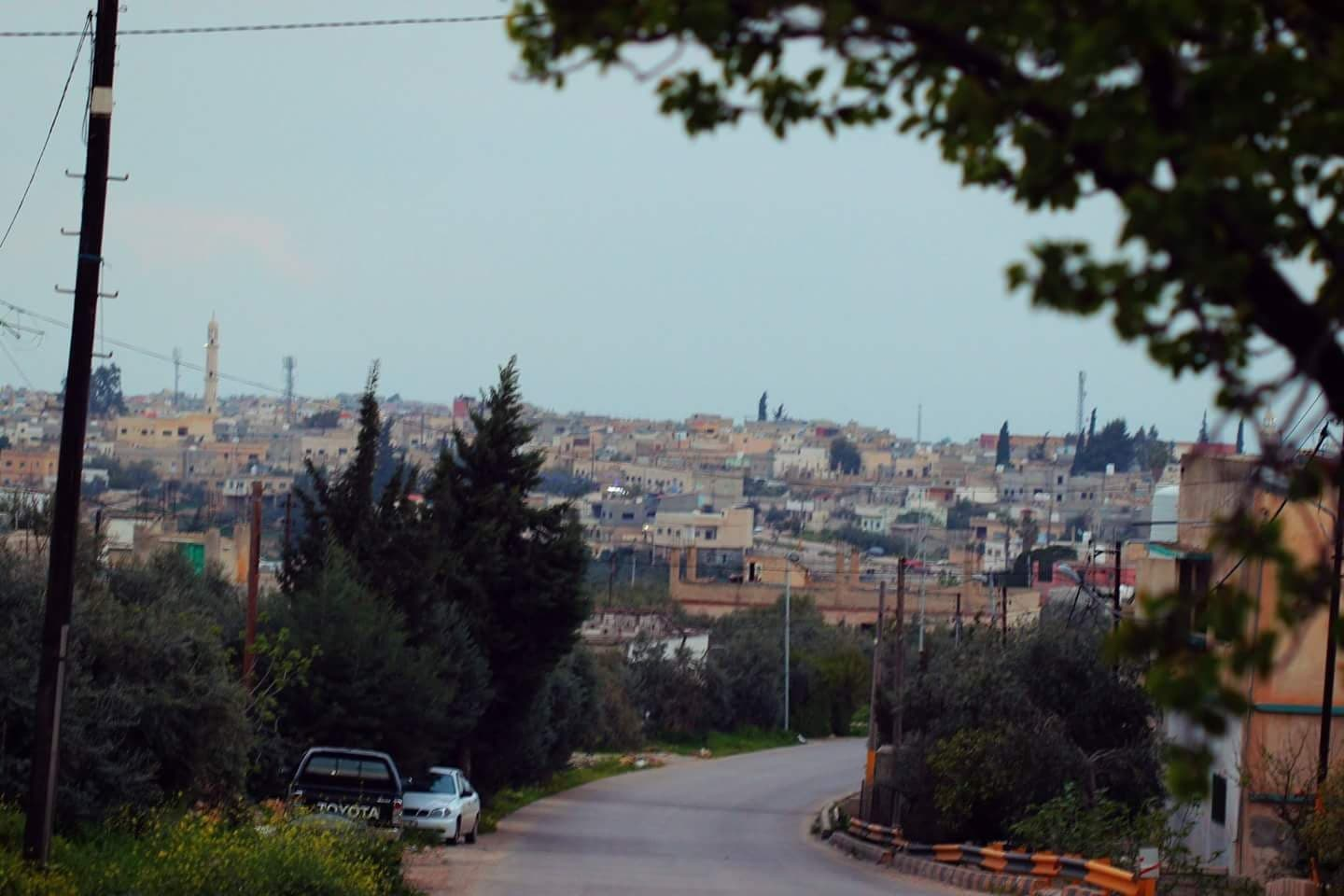

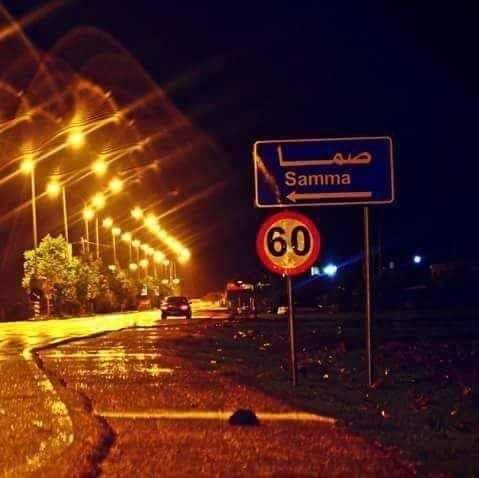

== See also ==
- Irbid Governorate

== Bibliography ==
- Government of Jordan, Department of Statistics (1964). First Census of Population and Housing. Volume I: Final Tables; General Characteristics of the Population (PDF).
- Hütteroth, W.-D.; Abdulfattah, K. (1977). Historical Geography of Palestine, Transjordan and Southern Syria in the Late 16th Century. Erlanger Geographische Arbeiten, Sonderband 5. Erlangen, Germany: Vorstand der Fränkischen Geographischen Gesellschaft. ISBN 3-920405-41-2.
- Robinson, E.; Smith, E. (1841). Biblical Researches in Palestine, Mount Sinai and Arabia Petraea: A Journal of Travels in the year 1838. Vol. 3. Boston: Crocker & Brewster.
