= Al-Āghwār ash-Shamāliyah =

Governorate of Jordan

Al-Aghwar Al-Shamaliyah
- District
- Location within Jordan
- Country: Jordan
- Governorate: Irbid

Area
  - Total: 246.3 km^{2} (95.1 sq mi)

Population (2015 census)
  - Total: 122,330
  - Density: 496.7/km^{2} (1,286/sq mi)
- Time zone: GMT +2
  - Summer (DST): +3

Al-Aghwar Al-Shamaliyah (Arabic: الأغوار الشمالية) is one of the districts of Irbid governorate, Jordan.
