= Tell Johfiyeh =

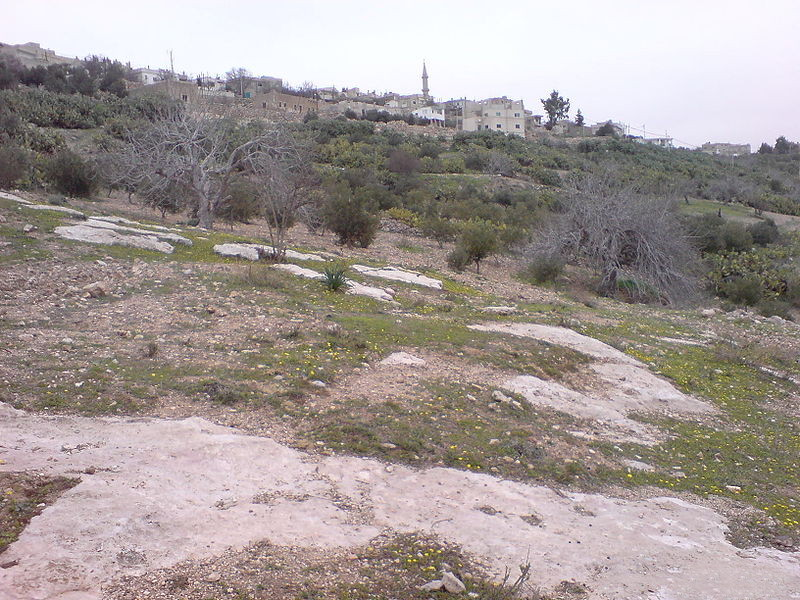
ruins of the historical village Johfiyeh

Tell Johfiyeh (2200 BC) is an archeological site in the village of Johfiyeh, Jordan, which dates back to the Iron Age. It is at the northern edge of the modern village of Johfiyeh, 7.5 km south-west of Irbid, in an intensive agriculture area.

== Overview ==
The activities of 2002 indicate that Tell Johfiyeh and the small archaeological sites in its vicinity were used most probably as farmsteads, dating back to the 7th century BC. The following results were obtained: Archaeological sites in the vicinity of Tell Johfiyeh • Founded mainly during the Iron Age • Usually re-settled during the Byzantine and Umayyad era • Most probably agricultural facilities • The sites maintained relations to each other • Tell Irbid or Tell el-Husn probably functioned as central sites • Two phases of settlement could be separated: Iron Age II and Byzantine-Umayyad era •z Remains of the latter were found exclusively on the south- western fringe of the tell and at the eastern slope. Remains of the Iron Age, however, were found all over the site and dominate the finds made so far. • Remains of the Byzantine-Umayyad era are: -A cistern -Remains of a small house -Two almost complete vessels of clay -Numerous clay sherds, glass and metal remains • The remains from the Iron Age belong to domestic activities within an agricultural world: -Numerous fireplaces and cooking spots, grinding- stones, mortars, basalt pestles and scrapers, weaving-weights, spinning-whorls, a three-footed basalt-bowl with tools, „buttons“, numerous stone-vessels, several arrow-heads made of iron and needles as well as a few pearls from carneol
