= Irbid Governorate =

Governorate of Jordan

Irbid Governorate محافظة إربد
- Governorate
- Country: Jordan
- Capital: Irbid
- Subdivisions: Capital Department, Bani Obaid Department, Al-Mazar Al-Shamali Department, Ar Ramtha Department, Bani Kinanah Department, Kourah Department, Al-Aghwar Al Shamaliyyeh, Taybeh Department, Wasatieh Department

Government
  - Governor: Mouamar Tanash

Area
  - Total: 1,572 km^{2} (607 sq mi)

Population (2015)
  - Total: 1,770,158
  - Density: 1,126/km^{2} (2,920/sq mi)
- Time zone: UTC+3 (GMT +3)
  - Summer (DST): +3
- Area code: +(962)2
- Urban: 82.9%
- Rural: 17.1%
- HDI (2021): 0.714 high · 6th of 12

Irbid or Irbed (Arabic: إربد) is a governorate in Jordan, located north of Amman, the country's capital. The capital of the governorate is the city of Irbid. The governorate has the second largest population in Jordan after Amman Governorate, and the highest population density in the country.

== History ==
=== Iron Age ===
During the Iron Age, the region around Irbid, known then as Gilead, was settled by the Israelites. Ar-Ramtha, the second largest city in the Irbid Governorate, is commonly identified with the Israelite city of Ramoth-Gilead, a Levitical city and city of refuge east of the Jordan River, mentioned several times in the Hebrew Bible.

By the late Iron Age, Gilead became the focus of a power struggle between the Kingdom of Israel and the Aramean kingdom of Aram-Damascus. According to the Books of Kings, Ramoth-Gilead was the location of a battle between Kingdom of Israel and Aram Damascus. During the battle, King Ahab of Israel joined King Jehoshaphat of Judah to fights the Aramaeans but was hit by an arrow and died from his wounds. Later on, it was also the location of a battle where Ahaziah of Israel and Jehoram of Judah fought against Hazael, king of Aram Damascus, and Jehoram was wounded. In this city, Jehu, the son of Jehoshaphat, was anointed by Elisha.

In the 8th century BCE, the Assyrians gained control of the area, followed by the Babylonian and the Achaemenid Empire.

=== Classical antiquity ===
The region was later distinguished by the Hellenistic, Roman and Byzantine civilizations, leaving behind them historical and archaeological sites. Roman and Greek cities such as Arabella (Irbid), Capitolias (Beit–Ras), Dion (Al Hisn) that contains the Roman artificial hill and small Roman lake (water reservoir), Gadara (Umm Qais), Pella (Tabeqt Fahel) and Abila (Qwailbeh) were established. They were members of the Decapolis: a pact that consists of the ten Roman cities in the area. Ghassanids had established their country in the north of Jordan covering Irbid, Golan and Horan plains. It was described as the most beautiful Syrian countries. Also it had the Islamic soldiers’ supplies. Christianity spread out there in the second and the third century CE.

=== Middle Ages ===
With the conversion work of Islam, the Islamic opening armies achieved an advance. As a result, Sharhabeel Bin Hasnaa made an Islamic victory in 634 CE (13 AH). He opened Irbid, Beit-Ras and Umm Qais. The Islamic leader Abu Obideh Amer Bin Al-Jarrah was able to open Pella. In 636 CE (15 AH) and in the prime of these victories, Khalid Bin Al-Walid managed to crush the Roman armies in the long Battle of Yarmouk. Consequently, he managed to put an end to the Roman presence in the area. In 1187 CE (583 AH) Saladin's armies advanced to Hittin where the most ferocious battle in the history of the Crusades took place. This battle was followed by recapturing Jerusalem and the whole region was gradually taken by the Ayyubids.

During the Mamluk period, Irbid played an important role as a stopping point for the pilgrims’ caravans coming from Turkey, north of Iraq and south of Russia. It was an important communication hub and a gateway to Egypt, Hijaz and Palestine coast, especially during the time in which Irbid was linked with Damascus, which had a positive effect on the cultural and scientific movement of Irbid, as referred by historical writings. In addition to the spread of a number of scientists and Islamic jurisprudence scholars, the Islamic expansion left many graves of the companions of Muhammad, many mosques and Islamic buildings such as Dar Assaraya (the former prison) which has been converted into a museum, Hibras Mamluk Mosque, Irbid Mamluke Mosque and Saham Umayyed Mosque.

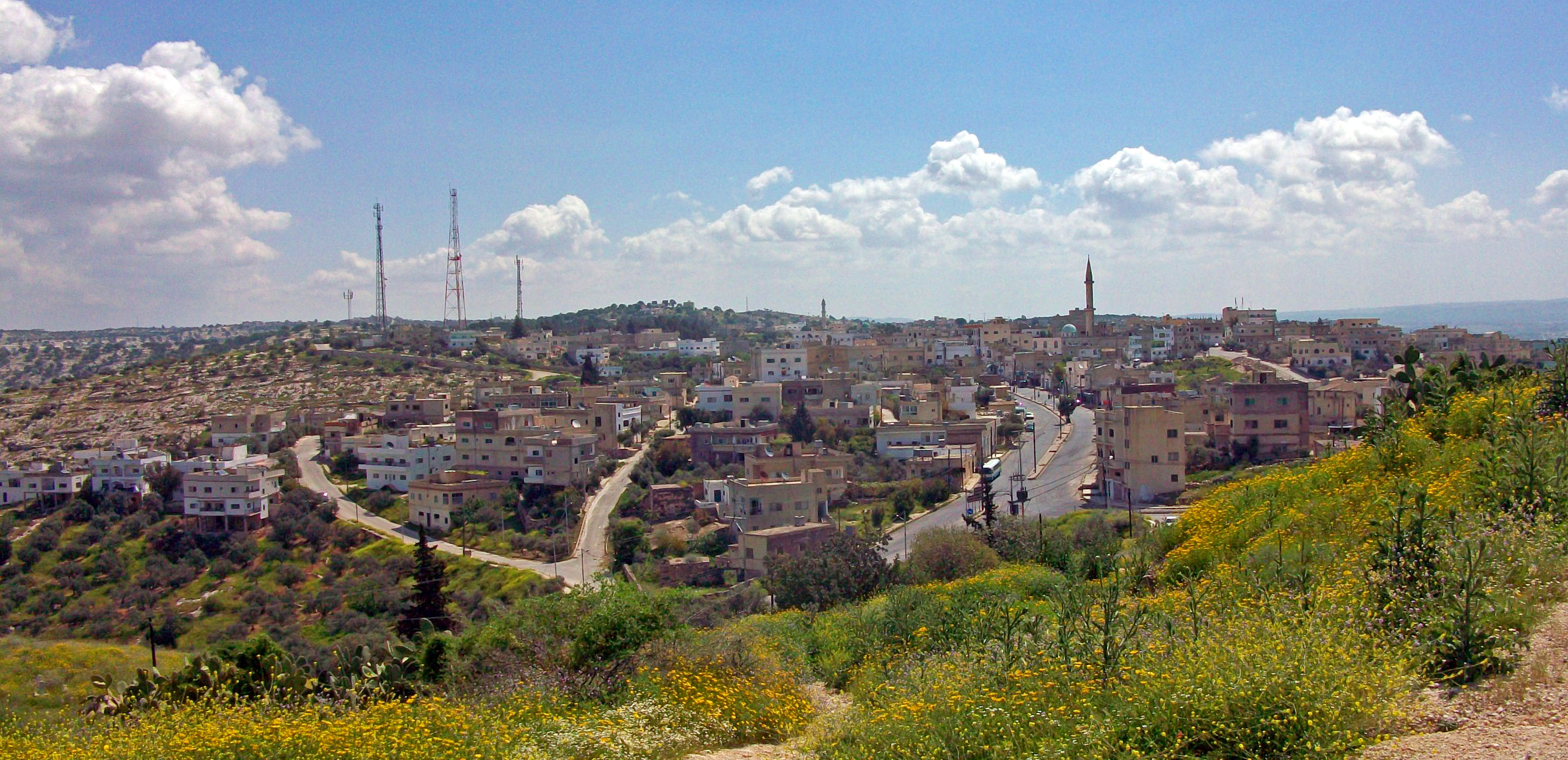
The city of Um Qais (Gadara)

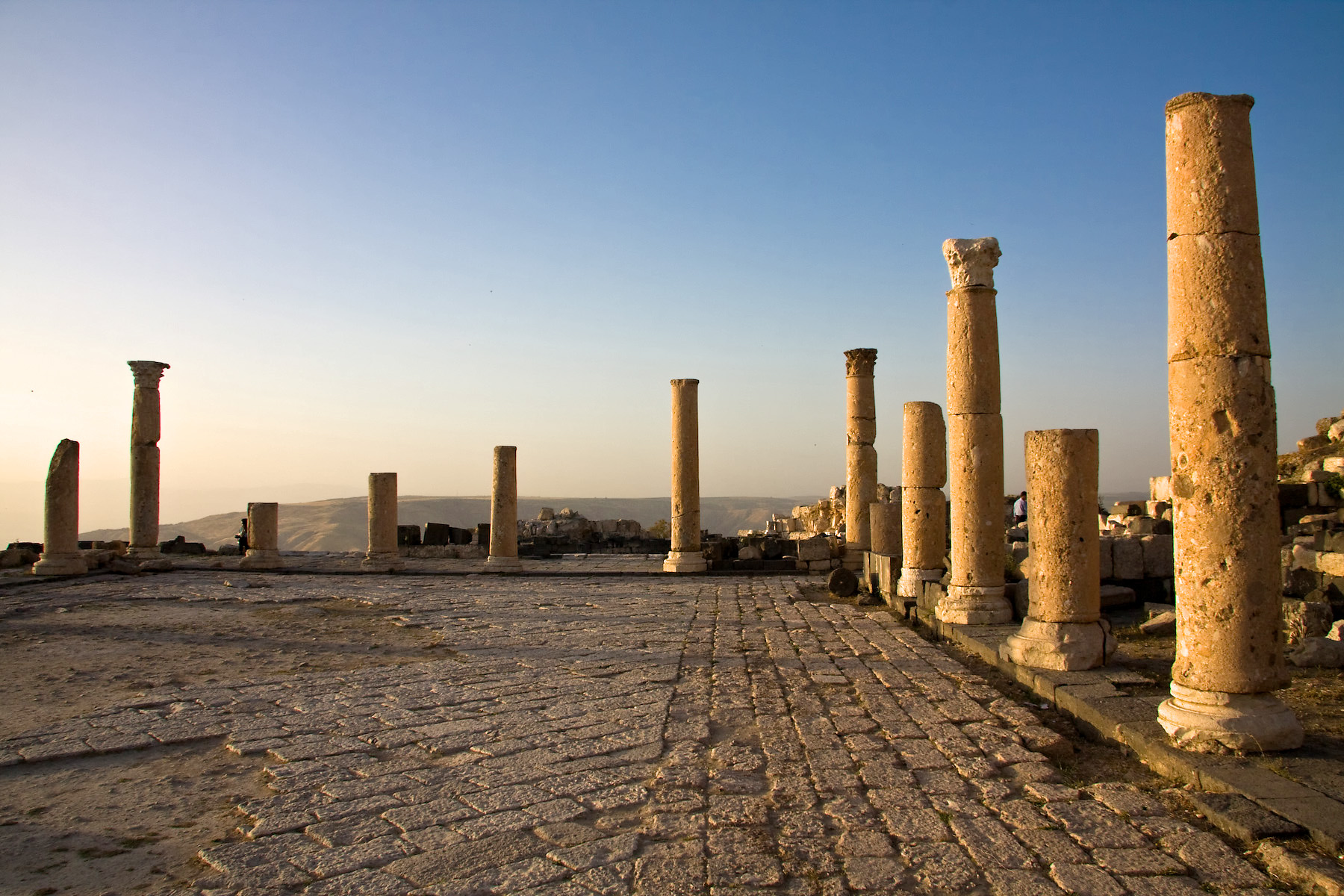
A Byzantine church in Um Qais

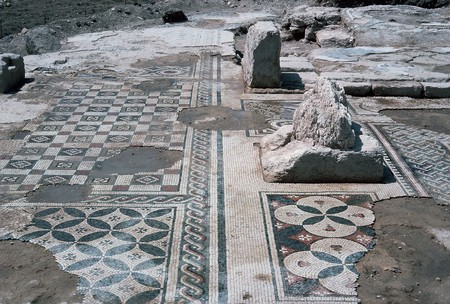
A Byzantine site in Ar Ramtha

== Geography ==
Irbid Governorate is located in the far north west of Jordan in the Yarmouk River basin and Jordan Valley. Most of the governorate is part of the Hawran plateau, which covers northern Jordan, and south-west Syria, Irbid located about 80 Km away from Amman the capital.

The governorate is bordered by Syria (the Golan Heights) from the north, the Jordan River from the west, Mafraq Governorate from the east, and Jerash, Ajloun and Balqa Governorates from the south. Irbid has the largest pond in the north of Jordan, called Al-Arayes Pond.

== Demographics ==
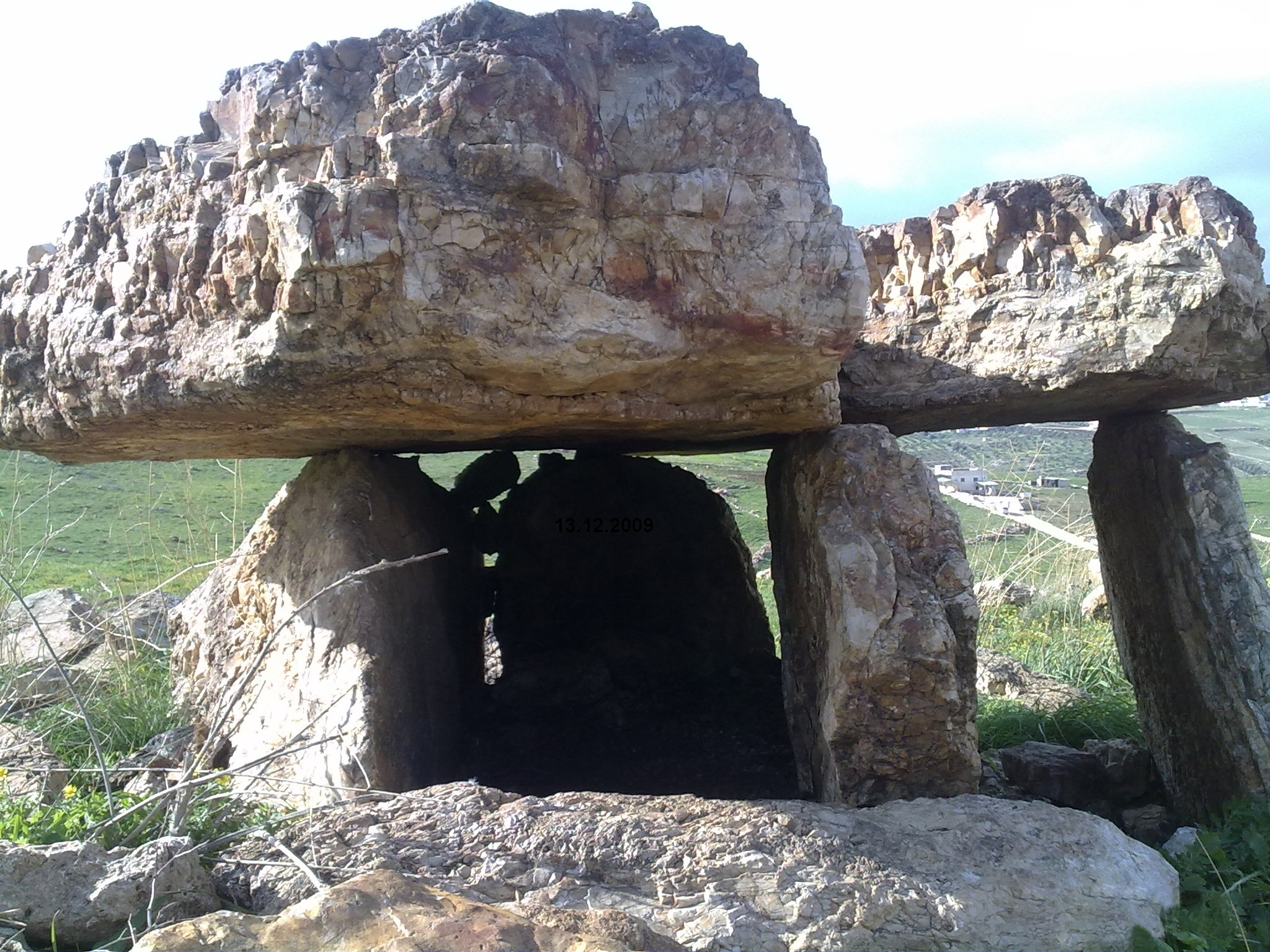
A dolmen in the ancient village of Juhfieh

The Jordan national census of 2004 demographic data indicate that Irbid Governorate had a population of 928,292. Estimates put the population slightly over one million for the year 2009. The next census was scheduled to be held in 2014.

Demographics of Irbid Governorate (2004 Census)
Female to Male ratio	48.9% to 51.1%
Jordanian citizens to foreign nationals	96.6% to 3.4%
Urban population	707,420
Rural population	220,872
Total population	928,292

The population of districts according to census results:

District	Population (Census 1994)	Population (Census 2004)	Population (Census 2015)
Irbid Governorate	751,634	928,292	1,770,158
Al-Āghwār ash-Shamāliyah	78,355	85,203	122,330
Al-Kūrah	71,513	91,050	161,505
Al-Mazār ash-Shamālī	35,651	44,166	78,427
Al-Wasṭīyah	...	24,046	42,571
Ar-Ramthā	79,304	109,142	238,502
Aṭ-Ṭaībah	23,847	29,132	51,501
Banī Kenānah	51,868	76,398	131,797
Banī 'Obeīd	...	93,561	204,313
Qaṣabah Irbid	...	375,594	739,212

== Administrative divisions ==
Irbid Governorate is named after its capital and largest city. It is divided into nine departments called alweya which is the plural of liwaa. Many of these departments are within the sphere of influence (and constitute districts) of metropolitan Irbid

	Department	Arabic name	Population (2004)	Administrative center
1	Al-Qasbah	لواء القصبة	375,594	Irbid
2	Bani Obaid Department	لواء بني عبيد	93,561	Al Hisn
3	Al-Mazār ash-Shamālī Department	لواء المزار الشمالي	44,166	Al Mazar al Shamali
4	Ar Ramtha Department	لواء الرمثا	109,142	Ar Ramtha
5	Bani Kinanah Department	لواء بني كنانة	76,398	Sama al-Rousan
6	Koura Department	لواء الكورة	91,050	Der Abi Saeed
7	Al-Aghwar Al Shamaliyyeh Department	لواء الأغوار الشمالية	85,203	North Shuna
8	Taybeh Department	لواء الطيبة	29,318	Taybeh
9	Wasatieh Department	لواء الوسطية	24,046	Kufr Asad

== Cities, towns, and villages ==
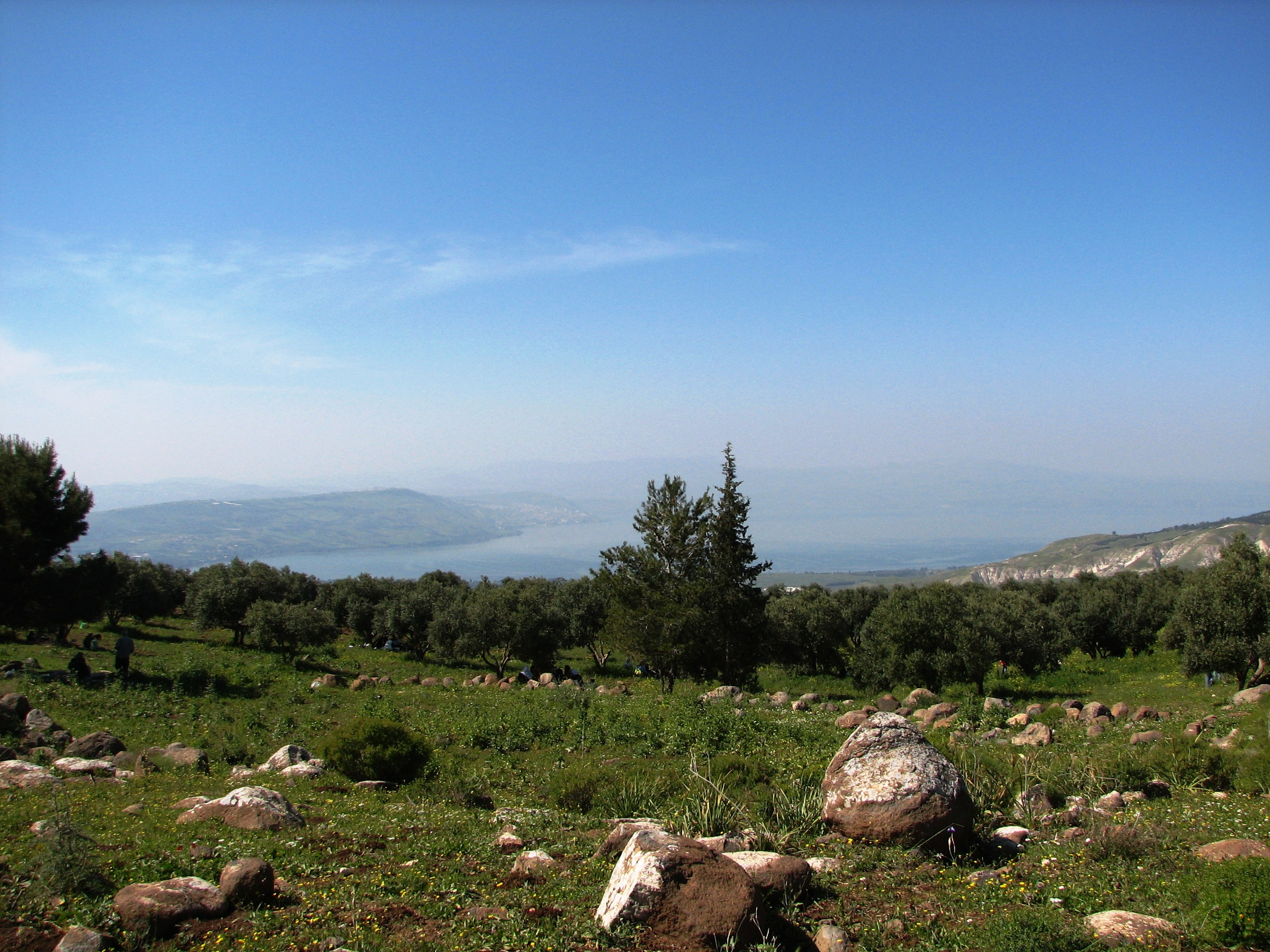
A view from northern Irbid over the Sea of Galilee

Irbid, the "Bride of the North," is considered one of the most beautiful Jordanian cities. Its population reaches about 650,000 (2008) and is situated on a plain land, 65 km. to the north of the capital, Amman. It is situated in the north west of the Hashemite Kingdom of Jordan, surrounded by fertile agricultural lands from north, east, west and south. Irbid was named “The Daisy” after the daisy flower, which grows in its plains. Irbid witnessed human settlements starting by 5000 BCE, such as settlements of the Canaanites, Israelites, Ghassanids and Arab civilizations.

- Ar Ramtha The second largest city in Irbid Governorate.
- Um Qais or (Gadara) as it was called during the Byzantine period is the most popular touristic destination in the Governorate.
- Many towns and villages surround the city of Irbid including:

Shatana (شطنا), Hartha (حرثا), Ham (هام) Kufr-Soum (كفرسوم), Al-Rafeed (الرفيد), Hibras (حبراص), Yubla (يبلا), Al-Taybeh (الطيبة), Habaka, Kufr-Rahta (كفر رحتا), Al-Mazar Al-Shamali, Bushra or Bishra, Hareema (حريما), Kufrasad, Kufraan (كفر عان), Jumha, Kufryuba (كفر يوبا), Zahar, Qum, Sammou', Izmal, Kufrelma, Soum (سوم), Saydoor, Samma, Marou, Ibser Abu Ali, Assarieh, Aidoon, Al Hisn, Kitim, Beit Ras, Dowgarah, En-Nu'aymeh, Houfa Al-Westiyyah, Al-Turrah, Qumaim, Huwwarah, Imrawah, Sal, Samad, AshShajarah, Turrah (الطرة), Hatim, Melka, Foauta, Zoubia, Rehaba, Kharja, Dair Yousef, Kufor Kefia, Summer, E'nbeh (عنبة), Dair Esse'neh (دير السعنة), Mandah, Zabda, as well as the town of Malka. there are many other towns and villages in the governorate such as Der Abi Saeed, Kufr 'Awan, and Kufr Rakeb.

== Economy ==
There are three Qualified Industrial Zones (QIZ) in Irbid Governorate: Prince Hasan Industrial City, Cyber City, and Jordan River Crossing City. The net exports value of Prince Hasan Industrial City reached US$274 million in 2001 benefiting from its status as a Qualified Industrial Zone (QIZ). Clothing, chemicals and electronics constituted its main exports. Irbid is at the top of the Jordanian agricultural regions especially in the production of citrus, olives, wheat and bee honey.

Irbid has several modern shopping centres that function as major retail and leisure hubs for the city and surrounding northern governorates. The largest is Irbid City Centre, a multi-story shopping complex developed by Marseilles Real Estate Investment Company and widely described as the biggest mall in northern Jordan. Another prominent destination is Arabella Mall, located in downtown Irbid, which combines retail outlets with dining and entertainment facilities.
