= Capitolias =

Ancient city east of the Jordan River, identified with the modern village of Beit Ras

- Καπιτωλιάς (Ancient Greek)
- Bayt Ras
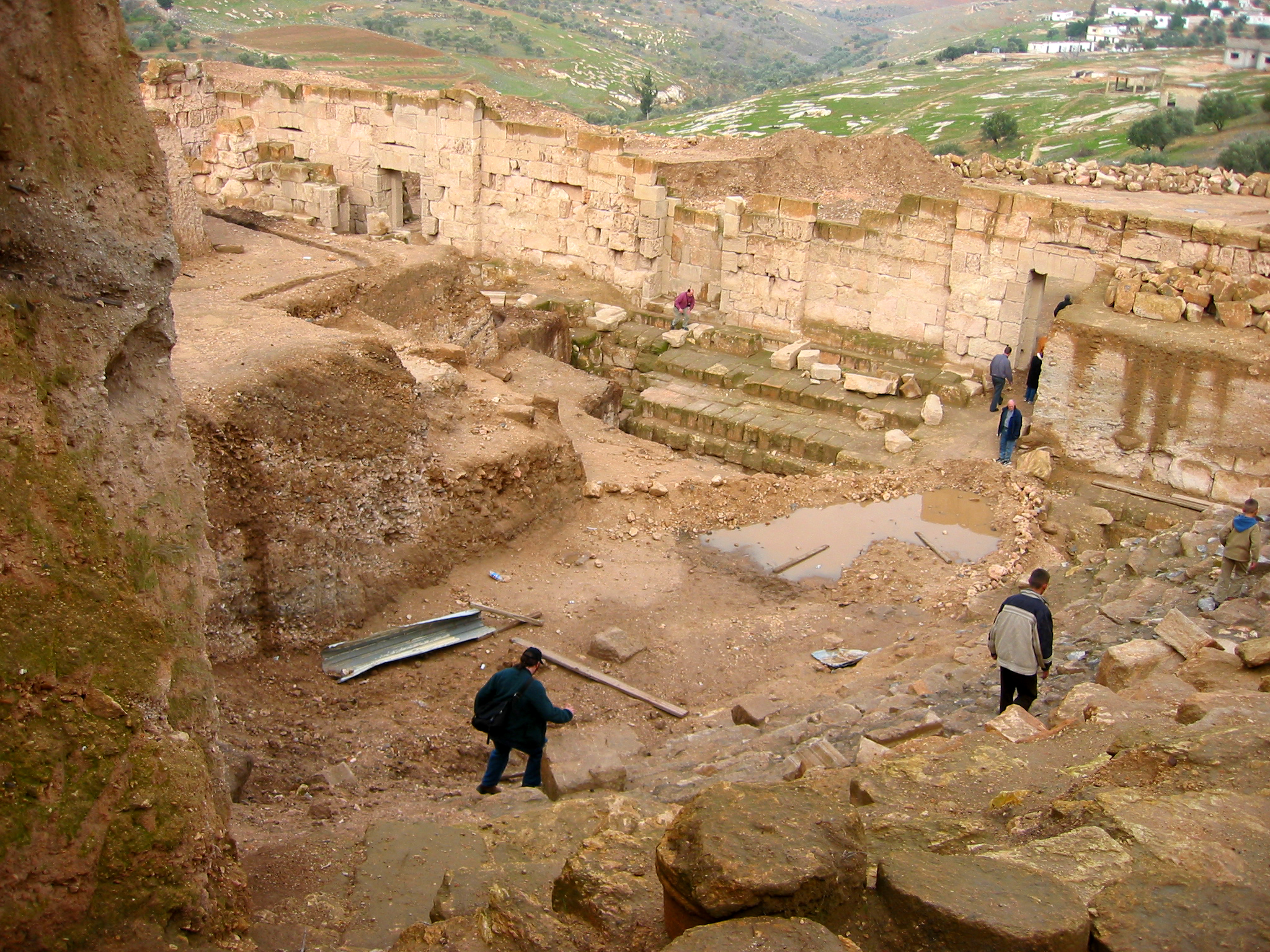
- Capitolias, 2004

- Location within Jordan
- 32°35′55″N 35°51′30″E
- Type: Settlement
- Location: Irbid Governorate, Jordan
- Region: Middle East
- Palestine Grid: 230/222

History
- Built: 97/98 CE

Site notes
- Condition: In ruins

Capitolias (Ancient Greek: Καπιτωλιάς, romanized: Kapitolias) was an ancient city east of the Jordan River, and is identified with the modern village of Beit Ras in the Irbid Governorate in northern Jordan. Anciently it was a town of Coele-Syria.

The Peutinger Table placed it between Gadara and Adraha (Daraa), 16 miles from each, and the Antonine Itinerary put it at 36 miles from Neve (Nawa, Syria).

The Arabic name, Beit Ras, preserves the Aramaic name, Bet Reisha, mentioned in the 6th-century Talmud.

Unfortunately, not very many ruins are left behind of the city of Capitolias. However, the main archaeological site remaining is a theatre structure.

== History ==
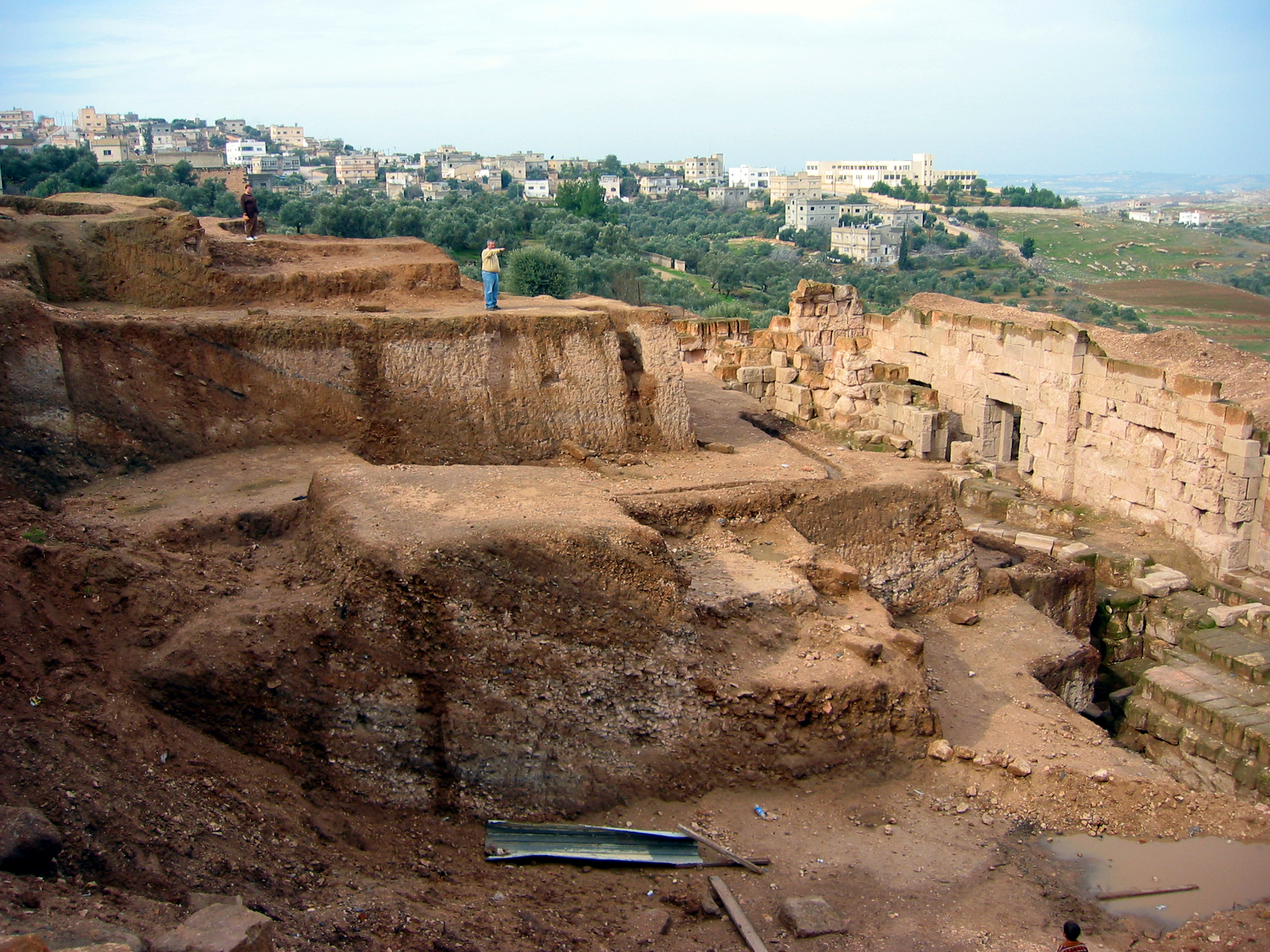
Capitolias theatre with Beit Ras in the background. 2004

The town is one of the ten cities of the Decapolis listed by Pliny the Elder. There are many primary sources, including Pliny the Elder that list different variations of the cities of the Decapolis.

Capitolias was founded as a planned Roman city, perhaps for military purposes, under Nerva or Trajan in 97 or 98 CE. This date comes from the coins that were minted within the city. Inscriptions show that local citizens served in the Roman army. It was surrounded by a wall built in the 2nd century and had an area of 12.5 hectares according to one source, 20 acres according to another.

The city was named after Jupiter Capitolinus. Evidence shows that the site was extensively settled and grew in importance during the Roman and Byzantine eras. Capitolias also had some importance in the early Islamic (Umayyad) period.

In the rearrangement associated with the creation of the Roman province of Arabia in 106, Capitolias became part of the province of Palaestina Secunda, whose capital was Scythopolis. It is mentioned by many geographers, including Hierocles and George of Cyprus in the 6th and 7th centuries.

Hassan ibn Thabit, a 7th-century Arab poet and companion of Muhammad, mentions high-quality wine from Beit Ras, indicating that it was transported by Bedouins to Arabia and was well-known in Medina during this period.

Yaqut al-Hamawi (1179–1229) noted about Beit Ras: "A village of Jerusalem, or, it is said, belonging to the Jordan Province, There are quantities of vines here, from which the celebrated wine is made."

In 1596 it appeared in the Ottoman tax registers named as Bayt Ras, situated in the nahiya (subdistrict) of Bani Juhma, part of the Hauran Sanjak. It had 30 households and 10 bachelors; all Muslim. The villagers paid a fixed tax-rate of 25% on agricultural products; including wheat (7,500 akçe), barley (1800 a.), summer crops (1200 a.), goats and bee-hives (300 a.); in addition to "occasional revenues" (200 a.). The total tax was 11,100 akçe.

In 1961, the population of Beit Ras was 1,280 inhabitants.

== Archaeology ==
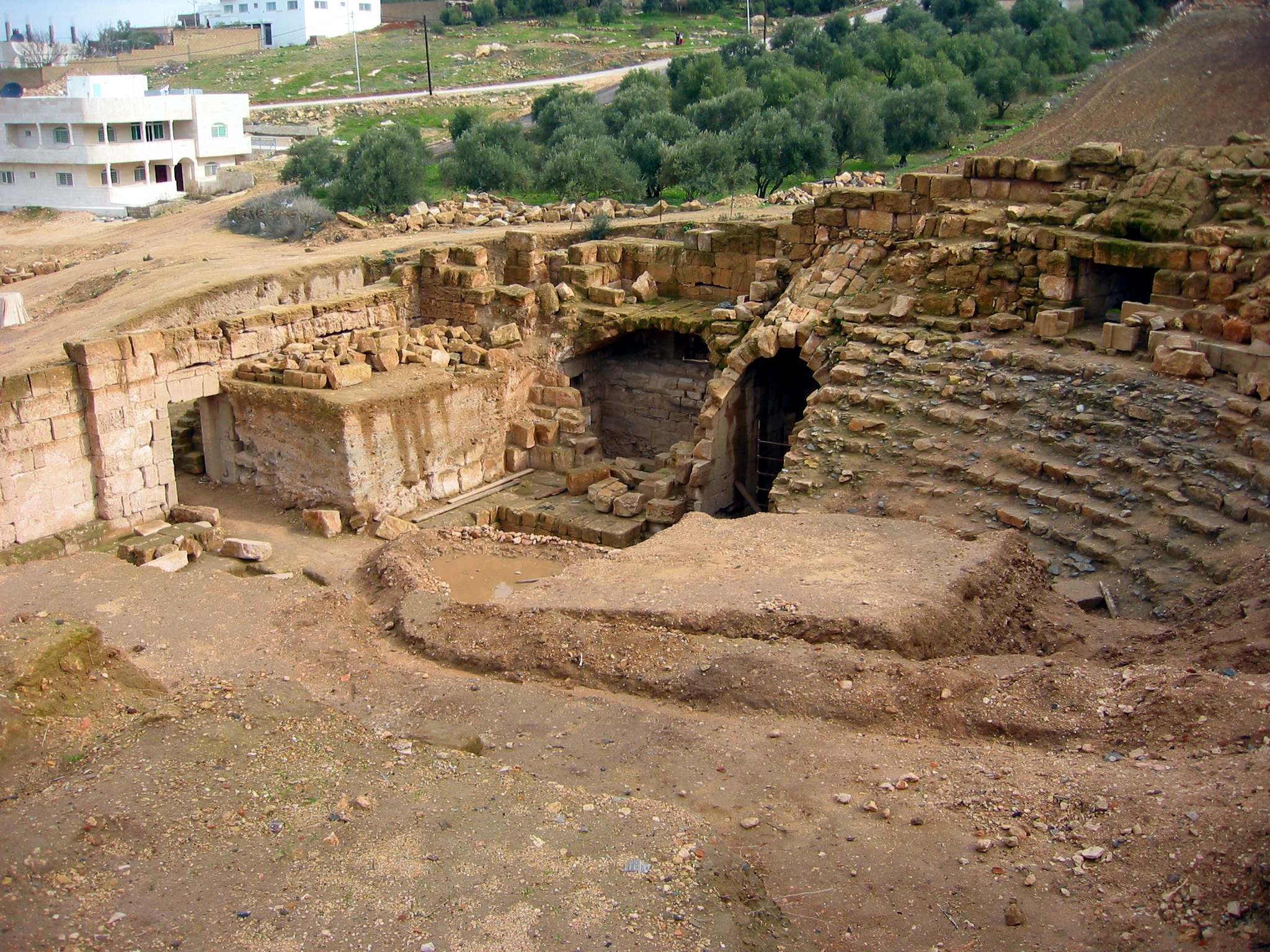
Capitolias Theatre, 2004

The city wall, with three north-facing gates, can still be traced on the surface Other remains include a temple of the Capitoline Triad, a three-tiered marketplace, a colonnaded street, a 5th-century church that was converted into a mosque in the 8th century, an aqueduct, reservoirs, a Roman military cemetery, and paved roads. Although these remains were all excavated, many are quite minimal. The most prominent remains is that of the Roman style theatre.

Although Capitolias was first excavated in the 1960s, systematic archaeological work began in the early 1980s and has continued.

It seems the citizens of Capitolias wanted to appear very Greek. Tombstones of one family were discovered, and dated to the 2nd century CE. Not only had the deceased adopted Latin names, but the tomb also had a very Greek style scene painted on it. The painting was a scene from the Trojan War with Achilles dragging the body of Hector.

Ample amounts of glass fragments have been discovered at the cite. These fragments were dated to 3rd-5th century CE. Further research has shown that large, primary chunks of glass were produced in the Levantine coastal area and brought to Capitolias for secondary production. So it seems that during the late Roman/early Byzantine eras, Capitolias was a main center for secondary glass production in Jordan.

Further excavation of Capitolias is somewhat difficult because of the modern village, Beit Ras. Researchers want to respectfully work with the locals to further their findings of Capitolias.

Only the part of the site without modern constructions could be studied by archaeologists. The "Beit Ras (Capitolias): an Archaeological Project" was conducted there from 2014 to 2016 by the Department of Antiquities of Jordan in cooperation with the Polish Centre of Mediterranean Archaeology and the Institute of Archaeology (both University of Warsaw), under the direction of Prof. Jolanta Młynarczyk. The project consisted of a geophysical prospection (2014) and excavation works (2015–2016).

The Polish-Jordanian excavations covered the northern part of the ancient city, to the west of the Roman theater. Non-invasive research using electrical resistivity scanning revealed remnants of urban architecture. Based on the pottery collected during the survey, it was determined that this area was in use from the 2nd to the 13th century. The excavation works yielded remains of defense walls, a winery, and workshops; the chronological sequence of the site from the Roman to the early medieval period was also established.

In 2018, archaeologists has excavated a tomb dating to the 2nd century AD. Its walls are decorated with many figures of humans, animals, and gods, as well as a large painting illustrating the construction of a rampart along with 60 inscriptions describing what the figures in the painting were doing. In its entirety, the artwork is thought to describe the founding of the city. The captions, written in Aramaic with Greek letters, resemble the speech bubbles in modern comics.

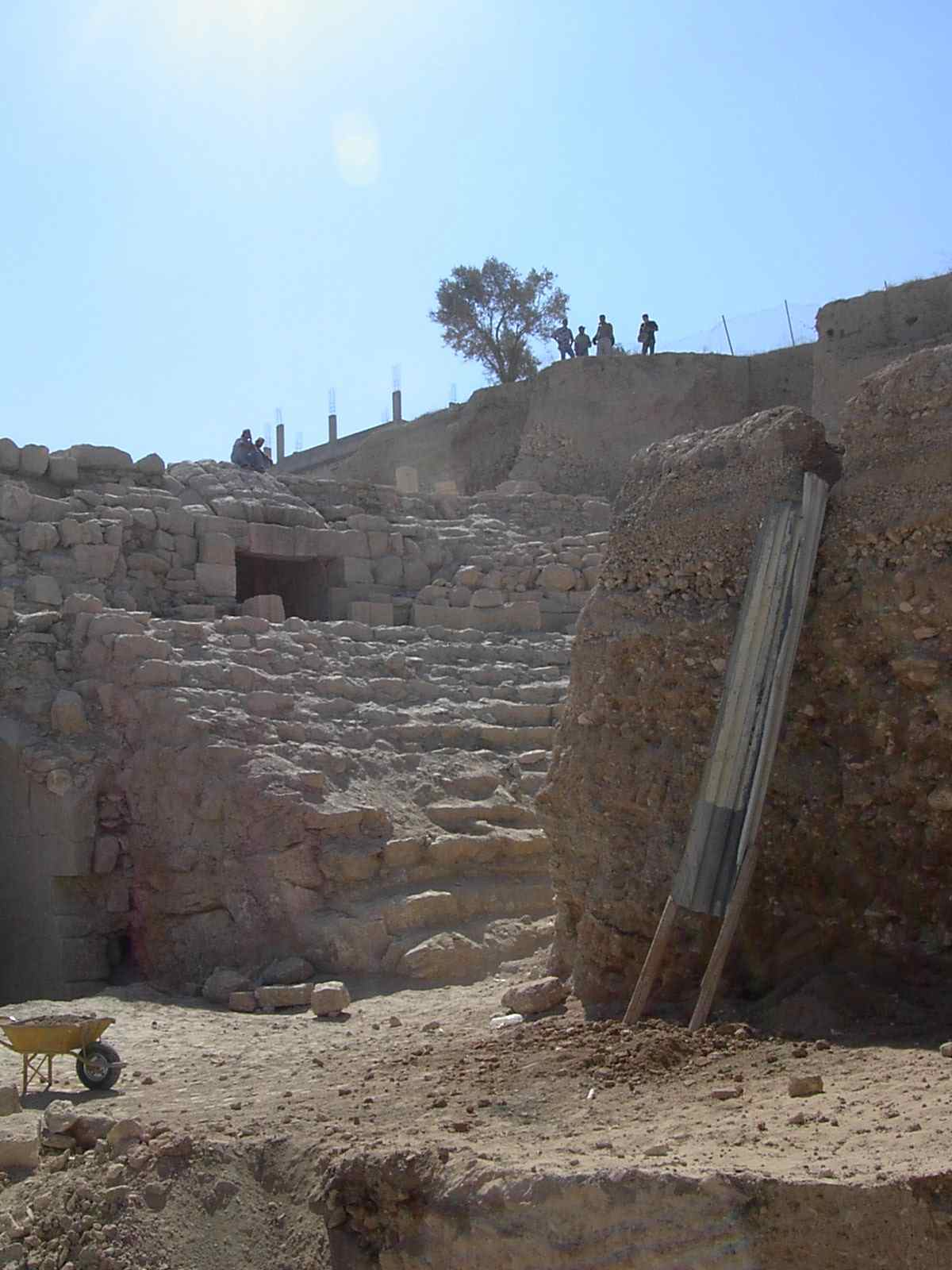
Ruins in Capitolias

== Bishopric ==
Bishops of Capitolias are mentioned in extant documents:

- Antiochus was at the First Council of Nicaea in 325
- Anianus/Ananias took part in the Council of Chalcedon in 451
- Bassus is mentioned in 518
- Two bishops named Theodosius are mentioned, one at the Council of Jerusalem in 536, the other in 600

Peter, who was martyred under Muslim rule, is given by Le Quien and Gams as a bishop of Capitolias, but other sources describe him as a priest, not a bishop.

In the 12th century the see was an independent archbishopric, as appears from a Notitia Episcopatuum of that time. No longer a residential bishopric, Capitolias is today listed by the Catholic Church as a titular see.

== Bibliography ==
- Government of Jordan, Department of Statistics (1964). First Census of Population and Housing. Volume I: Final Tables; General Characteristics of the Population (PDF).
- Hütteroth, W.-D.; Abdulfattah, K. (1977). Historical Geography of Palestine, Transjordan and Southern Syria in the Late 16th Century. Erlanger Geographische Arbeiten, Sonderband 5. Erlangen, Germany: Vorstand der Fränkischen Geographischen Gesellschaft. ISBN 3-920405-41-2.
- Strange, le, G. (1890). Palestine Under the Moslems: A Description of Syria and the Holy Land from A.D. 650 to 1500. London: Committee of the Palestine Exploration Fund.
- Młynarczyk, Jolanta (2017). Beit Ras (Capitolias): the archaeological project (2014–2016). Polish Archaeology in the Mediterranean. 26 (1): 473–504
