= List of hospitals in Jordan =

This is a list of hospitals in Jordan, sorted alphabetically by hospital name.

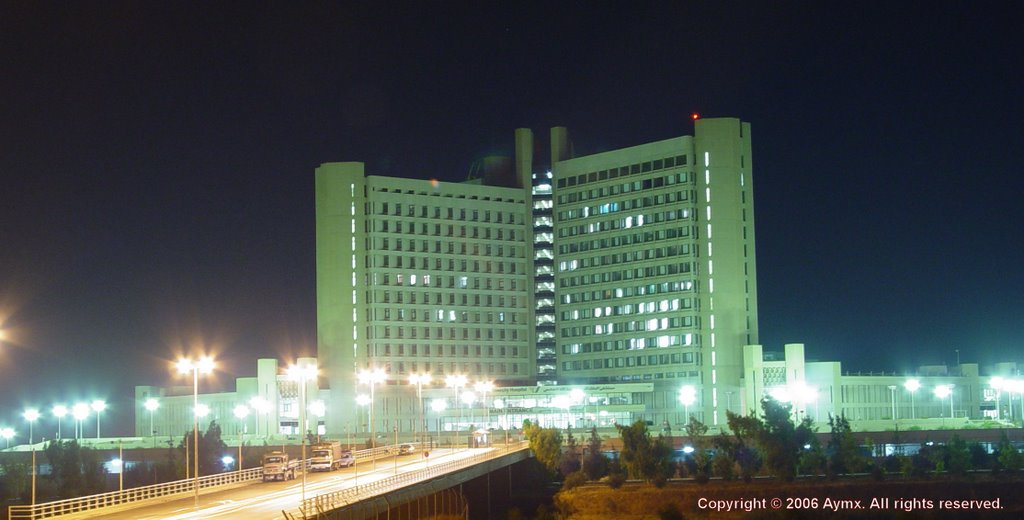
King Abdullah University Hospital in Irbid, the hospital of Jordan University of Science and Technology.

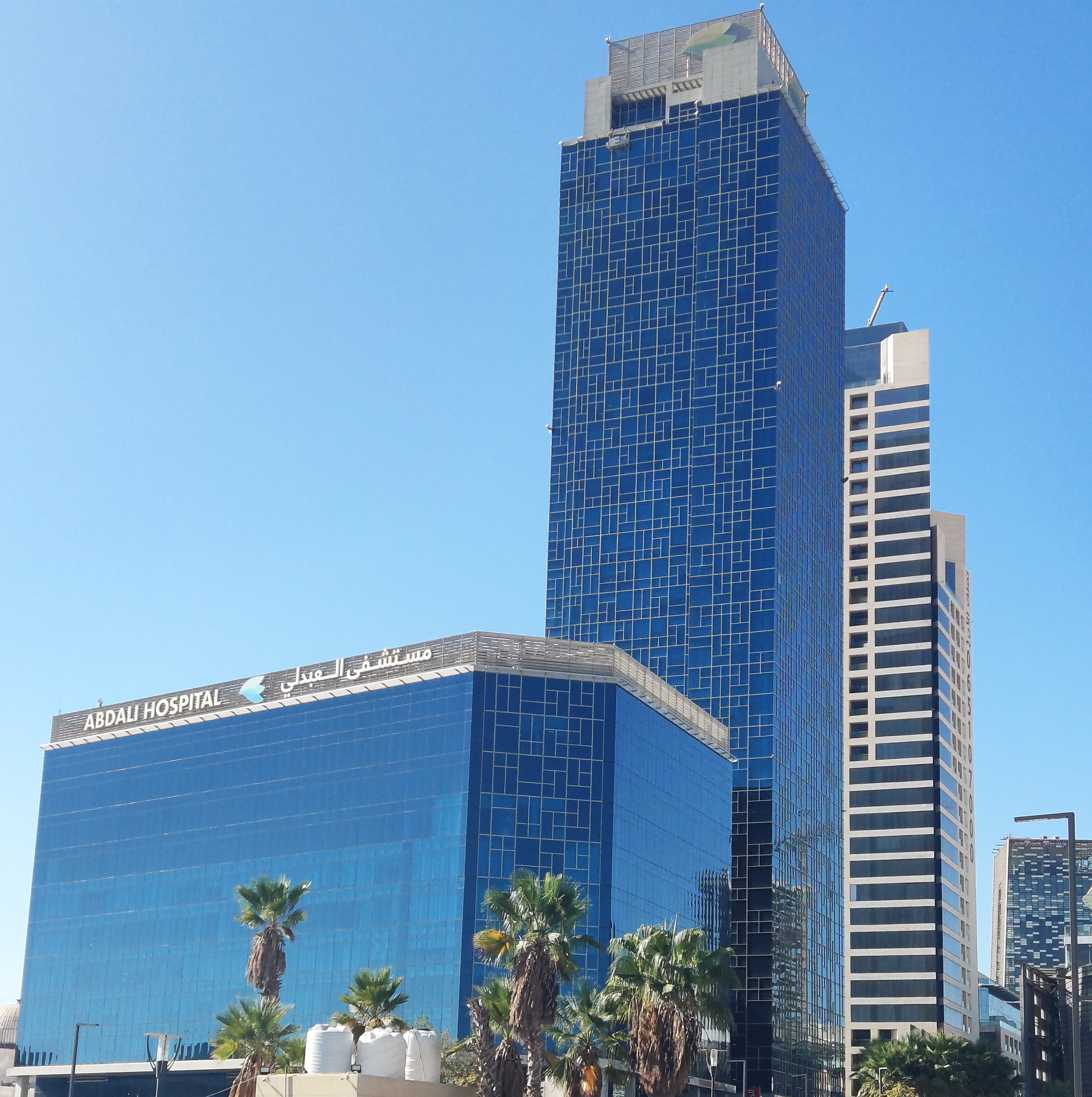
Abdali Hospital Exterior Image (cropped)

== Hospitals ==
- Abdali Hospital - Amman
- Abdulhadi Eye Hospital - Amman
- Ash-Shaami Hospital- Amman
- Abu Obaida Hospital - Irbid
- Akilah Hospital - Amman
- Al Ahli Hospital - Amman
- Al Bayader Hospital - Amman
- Al Dhalil Hospital - Zarqa
- Al Hanan General Hospital - Amman
- Al Hayat General Hospital - Amman
- Al Khalidi Medical Center - Amman
- Al Maqased Hospital - Amman
- Al Nadeem Hospital - Madaba
- Al Quds Hospital - Amman
- Al Safa Specialized Hospital - Jerash
- Al Shaheed Abu Diah Hospital - Amman
- Al-Amal Hospital - Amman
- Al-Aqsa Hospital - Amman
- Albashir Hospital - Amman
- Al-Essra Hospital - Amman
- Al-Hikma Modern Hospital - Zarqa
- King Hussein Cancer Center - Amman
- King Hussein Medical Center - Amman
- Al-Iman Hospital - Ajloun
- Al-Jazeera Hospital - Amman
- Al-Karak Hospital - Karak
- Al-Karama Hospital for Psychological Rehabilitation - Amman
- Al-Kindi Hospital - Amman
- Al-Mafraq Hospital - Mafraq
- Al-Mahaba Hospital - Madaba
- Almowasah Hospital - Amman
- Al-Najah Hospital - Irbid
- Al-Nour Sanitarium - Mafraq
- Al-Qawasmi Hospital - Irbid
- Al-Ramtha Hospital - Irbid
- Al-Rashid Hospital Center - Balqa
- Al-Razi New Hospital - Zarqa
- Al-Ruweished Hospital - Mafraq
- Al-Salam Hospital - Karak
- Al-Yarmouk Hospital - Irbid
- Amman Surgical Hospital - Amman
- Aqaba Modern Hospital - Aqaba
- Arab Medical Center - Amman
- The Arab Potash Co. Hospital - Karak
- Dr. Ahmed Hamayda General Hospital - Amman
- Dr. Jameel Al-Toutanji Hospital - Amman
- Eye Speciality Hospital - Amman
- Farah Center for Rehabilitation - Amman
- The Farah Hospital - Amman
- Ghor Al-Safi Hospital - Karak
- Heba Hospital - Amman
- Ibn-Alhaytham Hospital - Amman
- Ibn-Alnafees Hospital - Irbid
- The International Hospital - Amman
- Irbid Islamic Hospital - Irbid
- Irbid Speciality Hospital - Irbid
- The Islamic Hospital - Amman
- The Islamic Hospital - Aqaba
- Istiklal Hospital - Amman
- Istishari Hospital - Amman
- The Italian Hospital - Amman
- The Italian Hospital - Karak
- Jabal Al Zaytoon Hospital - Zarqa
- Jabal Amman Hospital - Amman
- Jerash Hospital - Jerash
- Jordan Hospital - Amman
- Jordan Red Crescent Hospital - Amman
- Jordan University Hospital - Amman
- King Abdullah University Hospital - Irbid
- King Hussein Cancer Center - Amman
- Luzmila Hospital - Amman
- Ma'an Hospital - Ma'an
- Malhas Hospital - Amman
- Marka Islamic Speciality Hospital - Amman
- Maternity and Children Hospital - Mafraq
- Milad Hospital - Amman
- Muaath Bin Jabal Hospital - Irbid
- National Center for Rehabilitation of Addicts - Amman
- The National Centre for Diabetes, Endocrinology & Genetics - Amman
- The National Centre for Mental Health - Balqa
- Palestine Hospital - Amman
- Philadelphia Hospital - Amman
- Prince Ali Bin Al-Hussein Military Hospital - Karak
- Prince Faisal Ben Al-Hussein Hospital - Zarqa
- Prince Hamzah Hospital - Amman
- Prince Hashem Bin Al-Hussein Military Hospital - Aqaba
- Prince Hussein Ben Abdulla II Center of Urology and Organ Transplant - Amman
- Prince Hussein Ben Abdulla II Hospital - Balka
- Prince Rashid Bin Al-Hassan Hospital - Amman
- Prince Zaid Bin Al-Hussein Hospital - Tafilah
- Princess Badeea Hospital - Irbid
- Princess Basma Hospital - Irbid
- Princess Haya Bint Al-Hussein Military Hospital - Ajloun
- Princess Iman Hospital - Balqa
- Princess Rahma Hospital - Irbid
- Princess Raya Hospital - Irbid
- Princess Salma Hospital - Madaba
- Qasr Shabeeb Hospital - Zarqa
- Queen Alia Heart Institute - Amman
- Queen Alia Military Hospital - Amman
- Queen Rania Hospital - Ma'an
- Queen Rania Pediatric Hospital - Amman
- Rahbat Al-Wardieh Hospital - Irbid
- Roman Catholic Hospital - Irbid
- Royal Jordanian Rehabilitation Center - Amman
- Shmaisani Hospital - Amman
- South Shona Hospital - Balqa
- Speciality Hospital - Amman
- Tla' Al-Ali Hospital - Amman
- Zarqa Hospital - Zarqa
- Zarqa National Hospital - Zarqa
