= Arab Medical Center =

Coordinates: 31°57′34″N 35°52′43″E

Arab Medical Center (AMC) المركز العربي الطبي
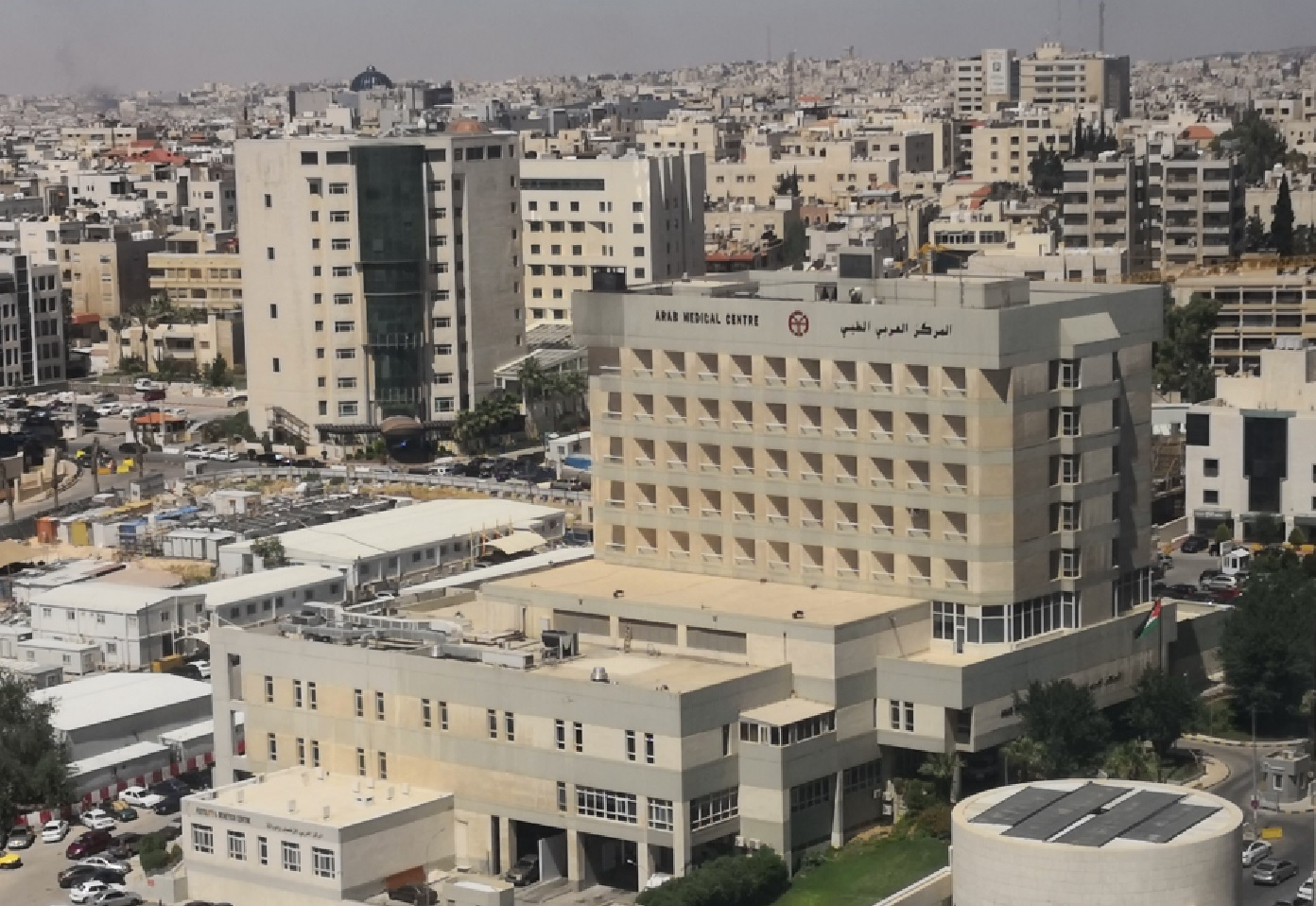
- Arab Medical Center (AMC) - Amman, Jordan

Geography
- Location: Jabal Amman, Amman, Jordan

Organisation
- Care system: For-profit
- Type: Community

Services
- Emergency department: Yes
- Beds: 145 Inpatient Beds (+98 Daily-Case Beds)

History
- Founded: 1994

Links
- Website: www.amc-hospital.com
- Other links: Health in Jordan

Arab Medical Center (AMC) is a community hospital located in Amman, Jordan. Initially established in 1994, as a center for cardiac excellence and specialty surgery, the AMC now caters for the majority of medical and surgical services both for adults and pediatric patients. In November 2019, the hospital celebrated its Silver Jubilee (25 years of operations), with a massive marketing campaign that involved room renovations, introduction of the new Cath. Lab, and the introduction of two new digital systems for patients complaints and patients satisfaction survey, among other activities.

== Medical Services ==
Some of the medical services and departments that AMC offers are:

- General, advanced & specialized surgeries
- Advanced cardiovascular catheterization
- Artificial kidney and dialysis unit
- ICU & CCU; care units
- Radiographic and magnetic imaging
- IVF & Infertility treatment unit
- Specialized cardiograph clinics
- Outpatient clinics
- Emergency Unit
- Comprehensive laboratories
- Endoscopy unit
- Lithotripsy unit
- Ophthalmology and Lasik unit
- Neonatal & Maternity unit
- Plastic & Cosmetic Surgery Center

AMC is one of three hospitals in Jordan (along with Jordan University Hospital and King Hussein Cancer Center) with stem cell and bone marrow transplantation capabilities.

== Arabi Care Card ==
In June 2018, a new pioneer loyalty program was introduced by AMC to offer discounts for customers directly on outpatient services; Laboratory, Radiology and In-Service Clinics services were set to provide card holders with discounts ranging from 10 to 20% on procedures or tests performed there. This was the first loyalty program among all other hospitals in Jordan.

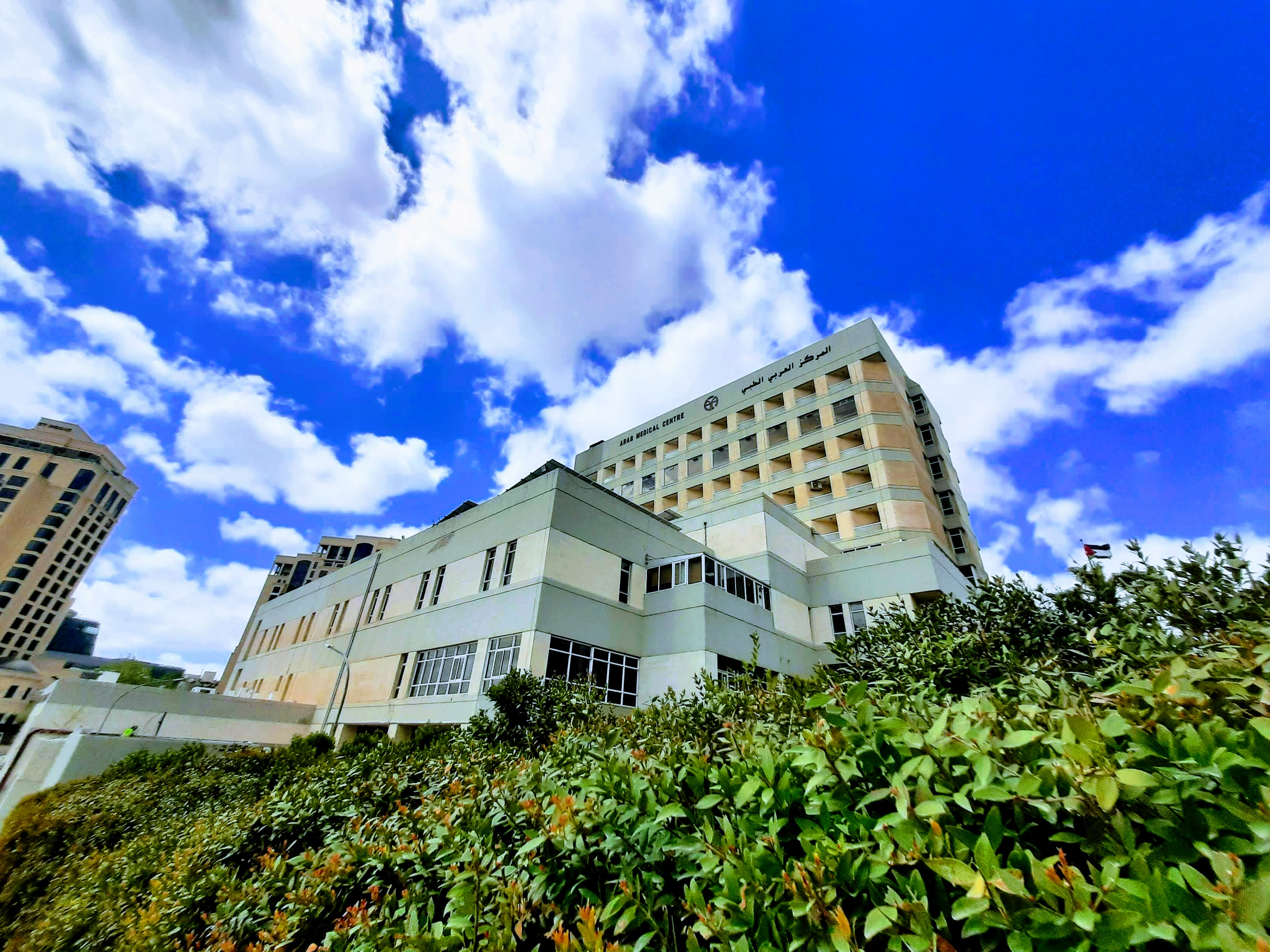
AMC Building from the outside

== Arabi Podcast ==
In late January 2020, AMC launched a new Podcast channel through SoundCloud service; this was the first such marketing venture among all Jordanian hospitals, with the aim to provide health and medical educational platform for public through hosting top physicians operating in the Jordanian private sector in various specialities. Among the first few episodes many subjects were to be discussed including; Ophthalmology, ENT, Gynecology, Endocrinology, Bariatric Surgeries, Neurology, Urology, Orthopedics, Gastroenterology and Other speciality medical conditions.

== See also ==
- Health in Jordan
- Medical tourism
