= King Abdullah University =

Institutions prefixed with the name King Abdullah University include:

- King Abdullah University Hospital, a hospital in Jordan
- King Abdullah University of Science and Technology, a private university in Saudi Arabia
