= Abdul Rahim Malhas =

Jordanian politician (1937–2012)

Ministry of Health
- Monarch: Hussein of Jordan
- Prime Minister: Abdelsalam Majali

Personal details
- Born: June 28, 1937 Amman, Jordan
- Died: September 29, 2012 (aged 75) Amman, Jordan

Abdul Rahim Malhas (28 June 1937 – 29 September 2012) was a Jordanian politician who served as Health Minister in the government of Abdelsalam al-Majali between 1993 and 1994. He was member of the 14th House of Representatives between 2003 and 2007.

== Life and career ==
Abdul Rahim Malhas was born on 28 June 1937 in Amman, Jordan, to his father, the Palestinian Dr. Qassem Abdul Rahim Malhas, and mother, Suad Jude. He was one of six children, along with his siblings Othman, Muhammad, Rehab, Ghazwa and Basma Malhas. His father, Dr. Qassem Malhas, was a pioneering physician who founded the first Jordanian-owned private hospital in Amman in 1945, known as "Malhas Hospital".

Malhas graduated with a BSc in 1959 and an MD from the American University of Beirut in 1963. He later worked in Jordanian army hospitals.

In 1994 he revealed corruption and embezzlement in health and food sectors by a publication in the newspaper Shihan.

== Published works ==
- limatha nahnu hakadha – asabab al-taraju'i al-'arabiyi (Why Are We Like This - The Reasons For The Arab Retreat), 2011
