= Jordan Journal of Civil Engineering =

- Discipline: Civil Engineering
- Language: English
- Edited by: Fouad Gharaybeh

Publication details
- History: 2007-present
- Publisher: Jordan University of Science and Technology Publishing (Jordan)
- Frequency: Quarterly

Standard abbreviations
- ISO 4: Jordan J. Civ. Eng.

Indexing
- ISSN: 1993-0461 (print); 2225-157X (web)

Links
- Journal homepage

The Jordan Journal of Civil Engineering is a quarterly peer-reviewed scientific journal covering civil engineering. It was established in 2007 and is published by the Jordan University of Science and Technology. Subjects covered include applications of civil rehabilitations, structural control, smart materials, earthquake engineering, geotechnical engineering and soil/rock mechanics, dam engineering, traffic and transportation engineering, water and environmental engineering, construction management and project planning, surveying and mapping, and infrastructures engineering, as well as numerical and analytical methods.

== See also ==
- Journal of Rehabilitation in Civil Engineering
