= Akilah Hospital =

Akilah Hospital مستشفى عاقلة
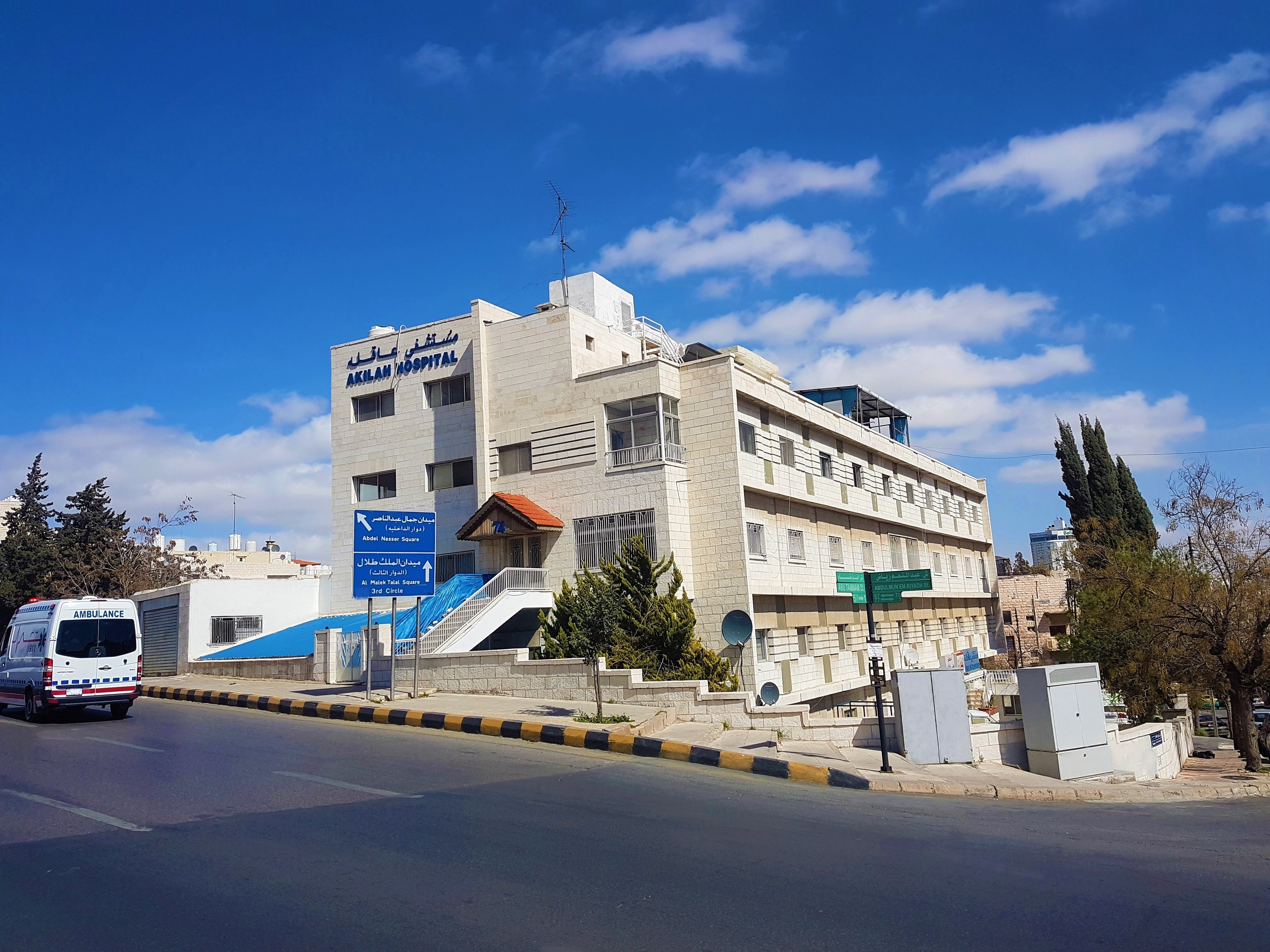

Geography
- Location: Amman, Jordan
- Coordinates: 31°57′06.7″N 35°54′35.1″E

Organisation
- Type: District General

Services
- Emergency department: Yes

History
- Founded: 1960

Links
- Website: akilahhospital.business.site
- Lists: Hospitals in Jordan

Akilah Hospital (Arabic: مستشفى عاقلة, romanized: mustašfā ʿĀqila) is one of the oldest and best-known private hospitals in Jordan, founded by Dr. Ali Ismail Akilah in 1960. It is located at Abdul-Monem Riad Street in Jabal Amman in Amman, the capital city of Jordan.

== Foundation ==
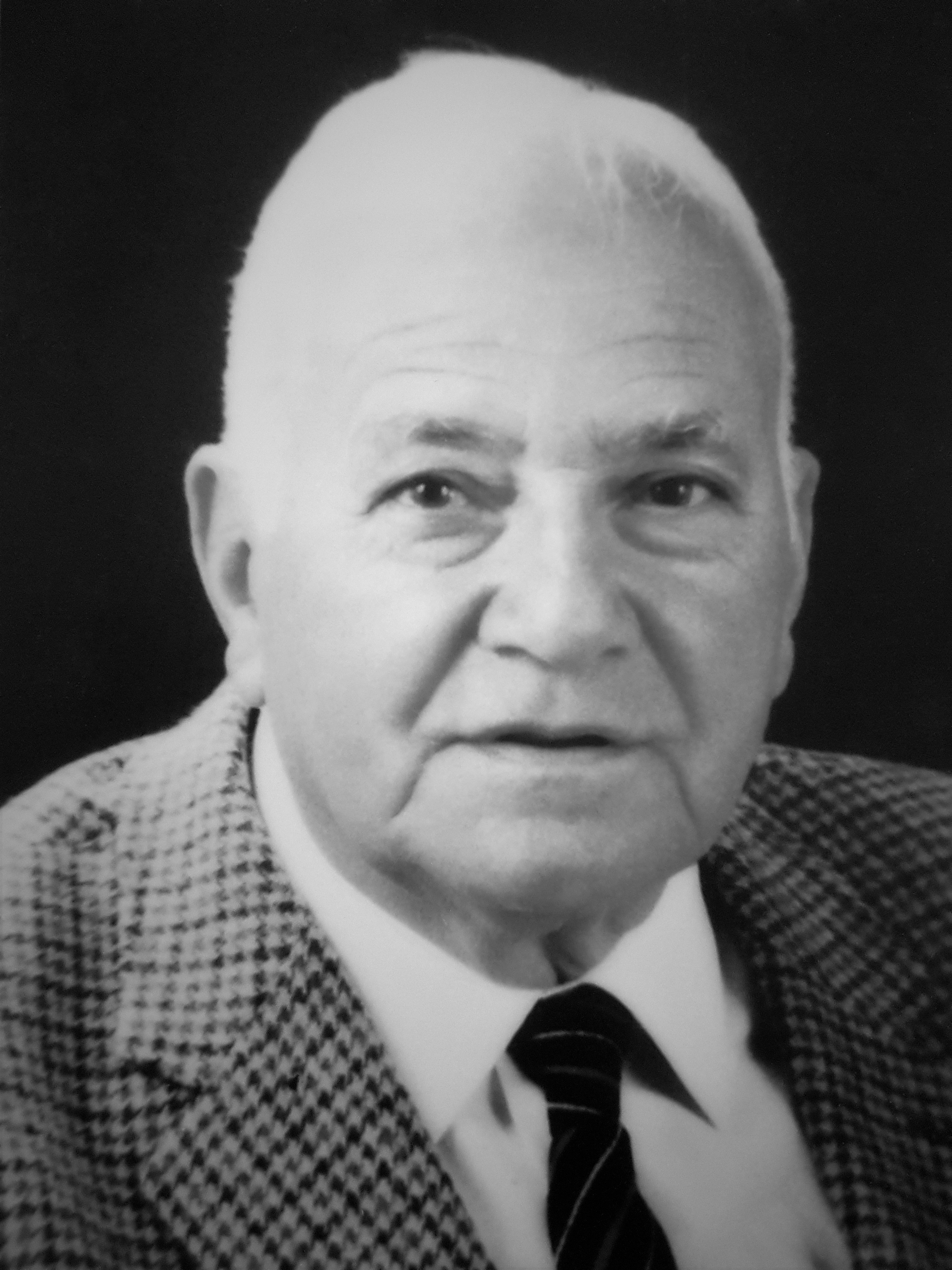
Dr. Ali Akilah, the founder of Akilah Hospital.

Dr. Ali Akilah was born in Lifta - Jerusalem in 1910 and graduated from the Faculty of Medicine at the American University of Beirut in 1939, then he worked in his private clinic in Lifta until 1941, and then as a surgeon doctor and Obstetrician in Hospital of Haifa until 1949, and then assigned at the United Nations Relief and Works Agency for Palestine Refugees clinic's in Qalqilya and then together with Dr. Basero (from Switzerland) the clinic had been developed into a health center with a surgical hospital.

- In 1957, he worked with the Saudi armed forces in Jordan as a surgeon at field hospital until he moved with the Saudi forces to Haql city.
- In 1958, he worked as a surgeon and director of Al-Baraha Governmental Hospital in Irbid city.
- In 1959, he worked as a director and surgeon at Hebron Governmental Hospital.
- In 1960, he established the first private maternity hospital in Jordan.
- In 1966, a hospital was opened in the city of Amman at the (Third Circle) in the name of Akilah Hospital to become specialized in Obstetrics and Gynecology, Pediatrics, Internal Medicine and General Surgery.

Dr. Ali said: ‘‘I decided to name it Akilah Hospital. The name "Akilah" came from my grandmother where they used to call us "sons of Akilah", Hence it became the name of the family, to which we now belong ’’.

According to birth certificates registered in the government, Dr. Ali said: ‘‘I've delivered more than (40) thousand babies and performed more than (100) thousand surgeries ’’

Many prominent figures in Jordan were born in Akilah Hospital, including ministers, deputies, professors, economists and businessmen.

His Majesty King Abdullah II honored Dr. Ali Akilah with the (Al-Hussein Grand Master Medal) in recognition of his bestowal humanitarian, medical, volunteer and dedication in providing support to the needy people, his son Dr. Musa Akilah received the Medal on behalf of his father.

== Medical specialties and departments ==
- Obstetrics and gynecology
- Fertilization, infertility treatment, and IVF
- Pediatrics
- Nursery and prematurity neonatal ICU
- General Surgery
- Orthopedic Surgery
- Internal Medicine
- Intensive Care Unit
- Dialysis Unit
- Radiology Department: X-Ray & CT scan Medical Diagnostic Imaging
- Laboratory
- Pharmacy
- Emergency Room

== See also ==
- List of hospitals in Jordan
