= Kamel Ajlouni =

Jordanian physician

Kamel Mohammed Saleh Ajlouni
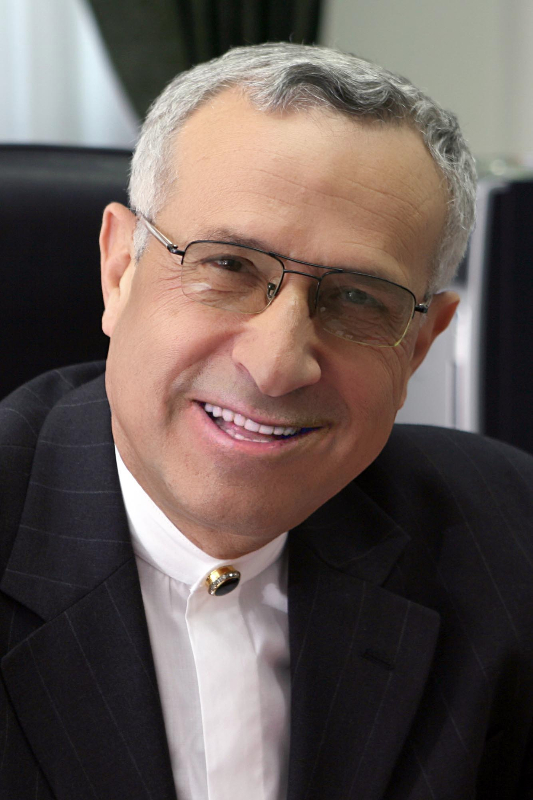
- Kamel Ajlouni

Senator
- In office 1996–2001

Personal details
- Born: 1 March 1943 (age 83) Sarih, Transjordan
- Citizenship: Jordan

Kamel Mohammed Saleh Ajlouni, M.D. (Arabic: كامل عجلوني, born 1943 in Sariyyeh, Jordan) is a physician in the field of endocrinology. He earned a doctor of medicine degree from the Heidelberg University School of Medicine in 1967. Ajlouni became professor of endocrinology in the Department of Internal medicine at the University of Jordan in 1985. Professor Ajlouni has written more than 120 professional papers in the field of endocrinology. In recognition of his contributions, the American Association of Clinical Endocrinologists presented him with the International Clinician Award in 2008. He received Hamdan Award for honoring distinguished personalities from the Arab World from Hamdan Medical Award in 2010.

Ajlouni has worked in numerous posts, mainly as minister of health from 1984 to 1985. He is one of the founders of the Jordan University of Science and Technology and was its president from 1986 to 1995. Ajlouni is the president of the National Center for Diabetes, Endocrinology & Genetics in Jordan since 1996. Professor Ajlouni was also a senator in the Jordanian Congress from 1996 to 2001.

== Education ==
Ajlouni went through school in Rashidiah College in Jerusalem from 1955 to 1958, then high school in Hussein College, Amman from 1958 to 1960. He later attended Studien Kollege (General Science), University of Heidelberg, West Germany, from 1961 to 1962, and then went to the medical school from 1962 to 1967. He graduated (state examination) on 11 December 1967 (magna cum laude). He got his doctor of medicine degree in anatomy from the University of Heidelberg, on 16 February 1968 (cum laude).
