= Jordan Hospital =

Hospital in Amman, Jordan

Coordinates: 31.9607°N 35.9000°E

- مستشفى الأردن

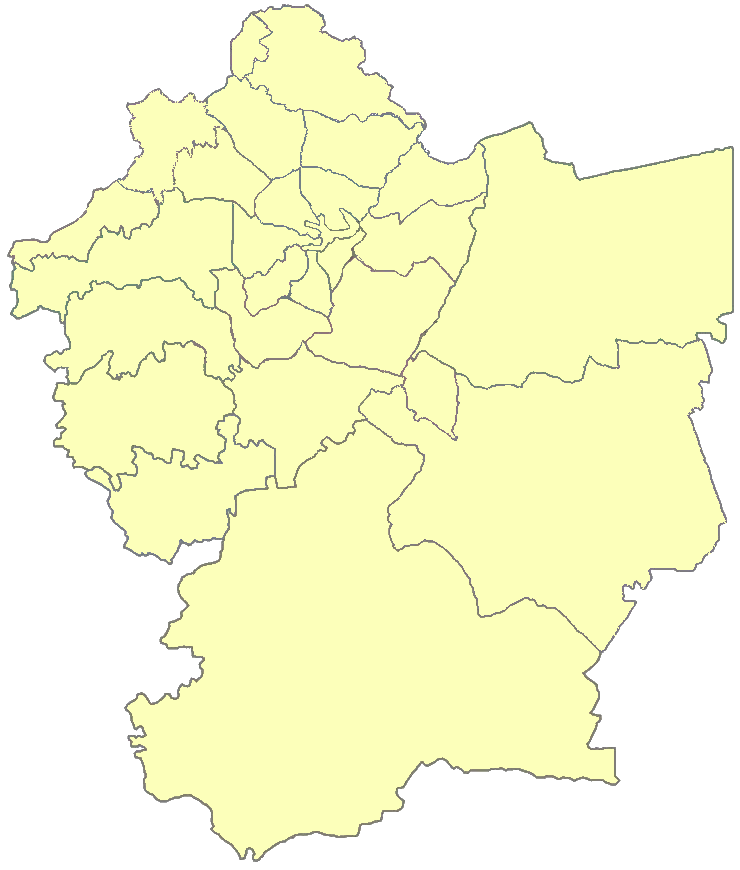

Geography
- Location: Queen Nour St., Amman, Jordan

Organisation
- Type: Teaching
- Affiliated university: George Washington University; University of Nebraska–Lincoln; Toledo University

Services
- Beds: 300

History
- Founded: 1993

Links
- Website: Jordan Hospital
- Lists: Hospitals in Jordan

Jordan Hospital (Arabic: مستشفى الأردن, romanized: Mustashfā l-ʾUrdunn) is a private hospital in Amman, Jordan, established in 1993 under royal patronage. A 300-bed multispecialty equipped facility, it is one of the leaders in healthcare in the country, and is a main referral center in the Middle East.
