= Jordan University Hospital =

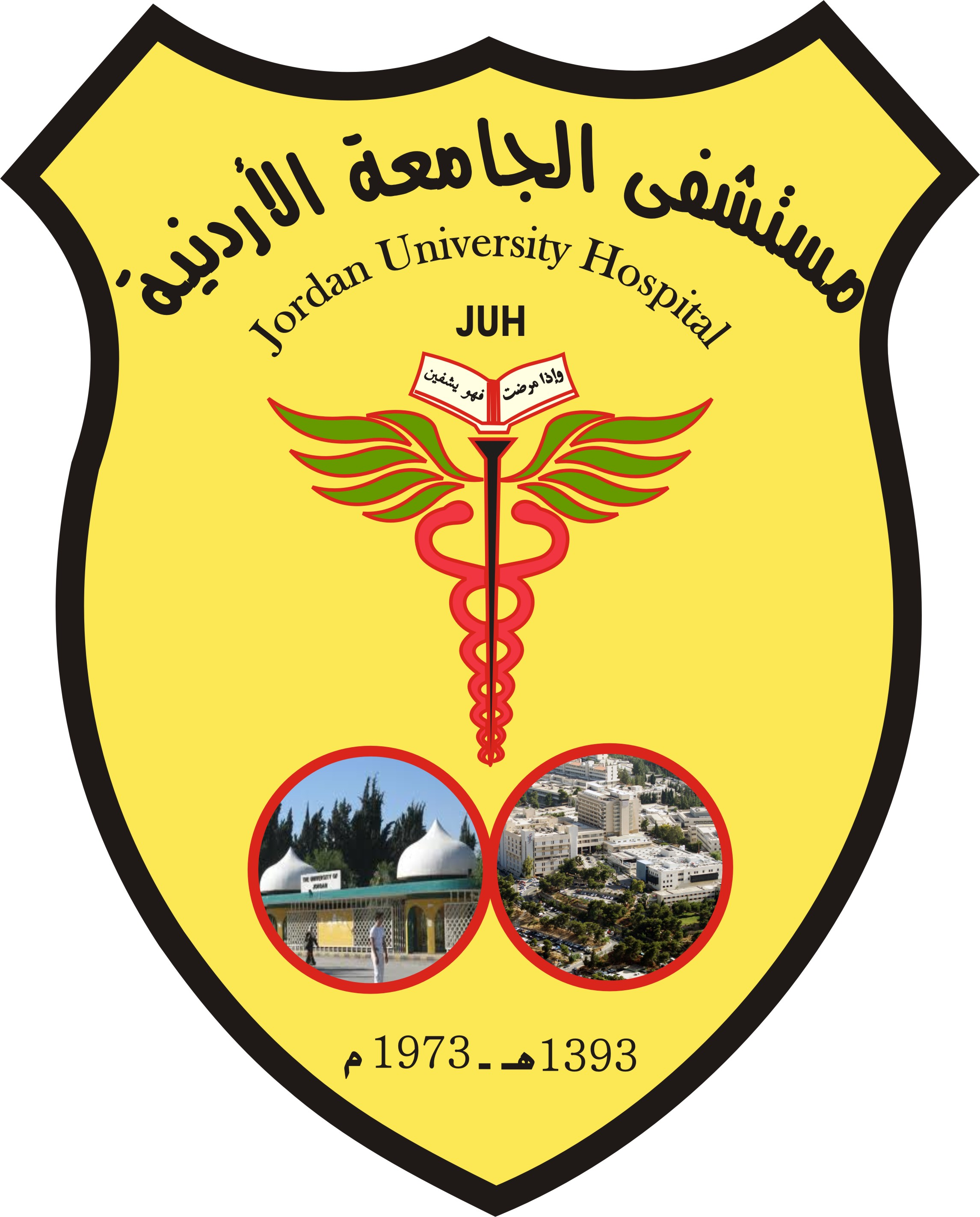

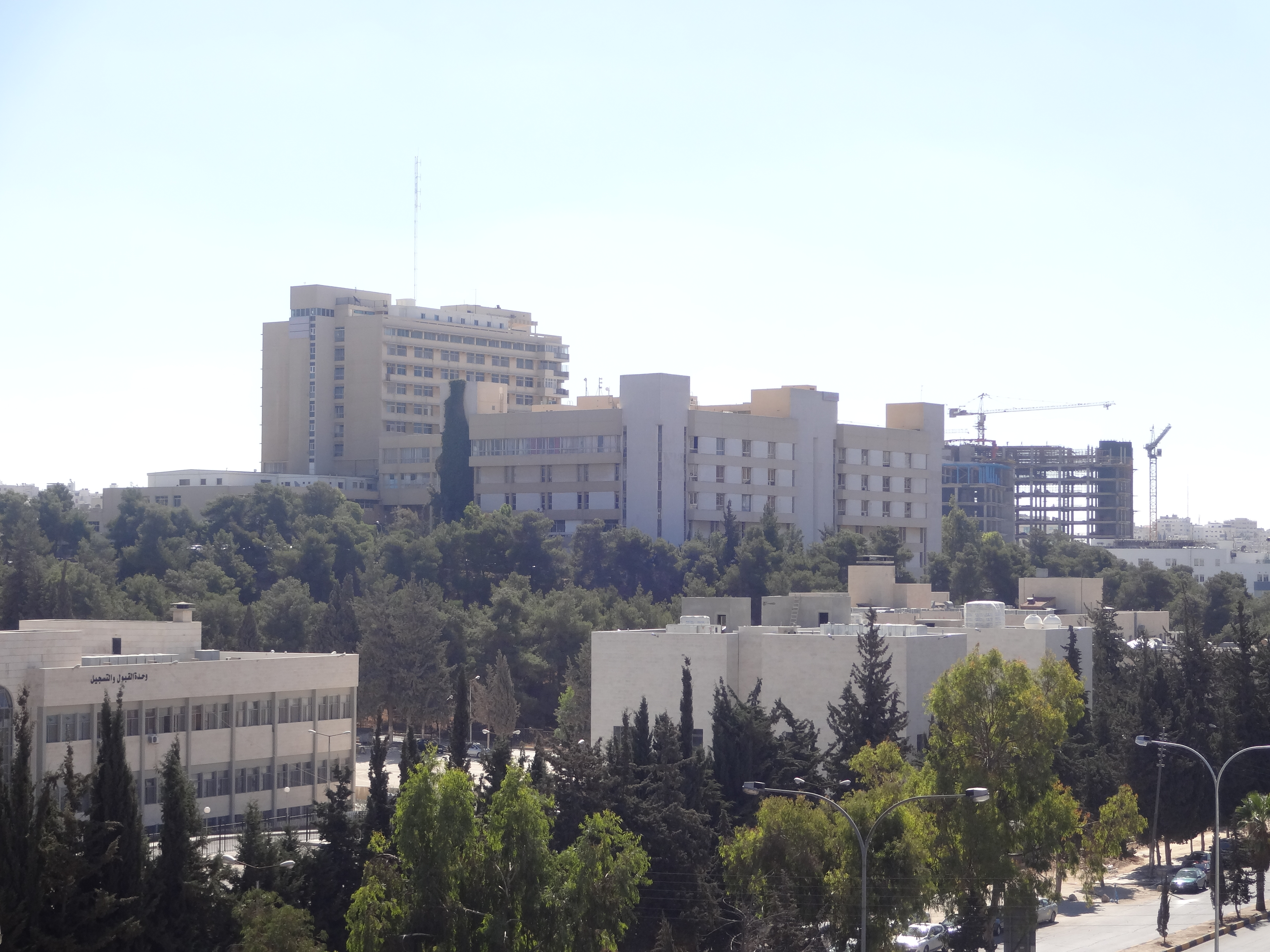
- An image of the Jordan University Hospital building taken from Queen Rania St. perspective.

Geography
- Location: Located within the University of Jordan campus, Jubeiha, Amman, Jordan
- Coordinates: 32.007546°N 35.874742°E

Organisation
- Type: Teaching
- Affiliated university: University of Jordan

Services
- Emergency department: Yes

History
- Opened: 1973

Links
- Website: www.hospital.ju.edu.jo

Jordan University Hospital (JUH) (Arabic: مستشفى الجامعة الأردنية) is a public teaching hospital located on the University of Jordan campus in the Jubeiha district of Amman, Jordan. Established in 1973 as The Great Amman Hospital (Arabic: مستشفى عمان الكبير), it was integrated into the University of Jordan in 1975 and renamed Jordan University Hospital. JUH is the first university-affiliated teaching hospital in Jordan, and has grown into a major tertiary care center serving patients from across Jordan and neighboring countries. The hospital handles a high volume of patients (over half a million annually) and offers advanced medical services in numerous specialties. It is accredited by Joint Commission International (JCI) – being the first hospital in the Arab region (second in the Middle East and eighteenth worldwide) to earn JCI accreditation – and by Jordan's Health Care Accreditation Council (HCAC).

== History ==
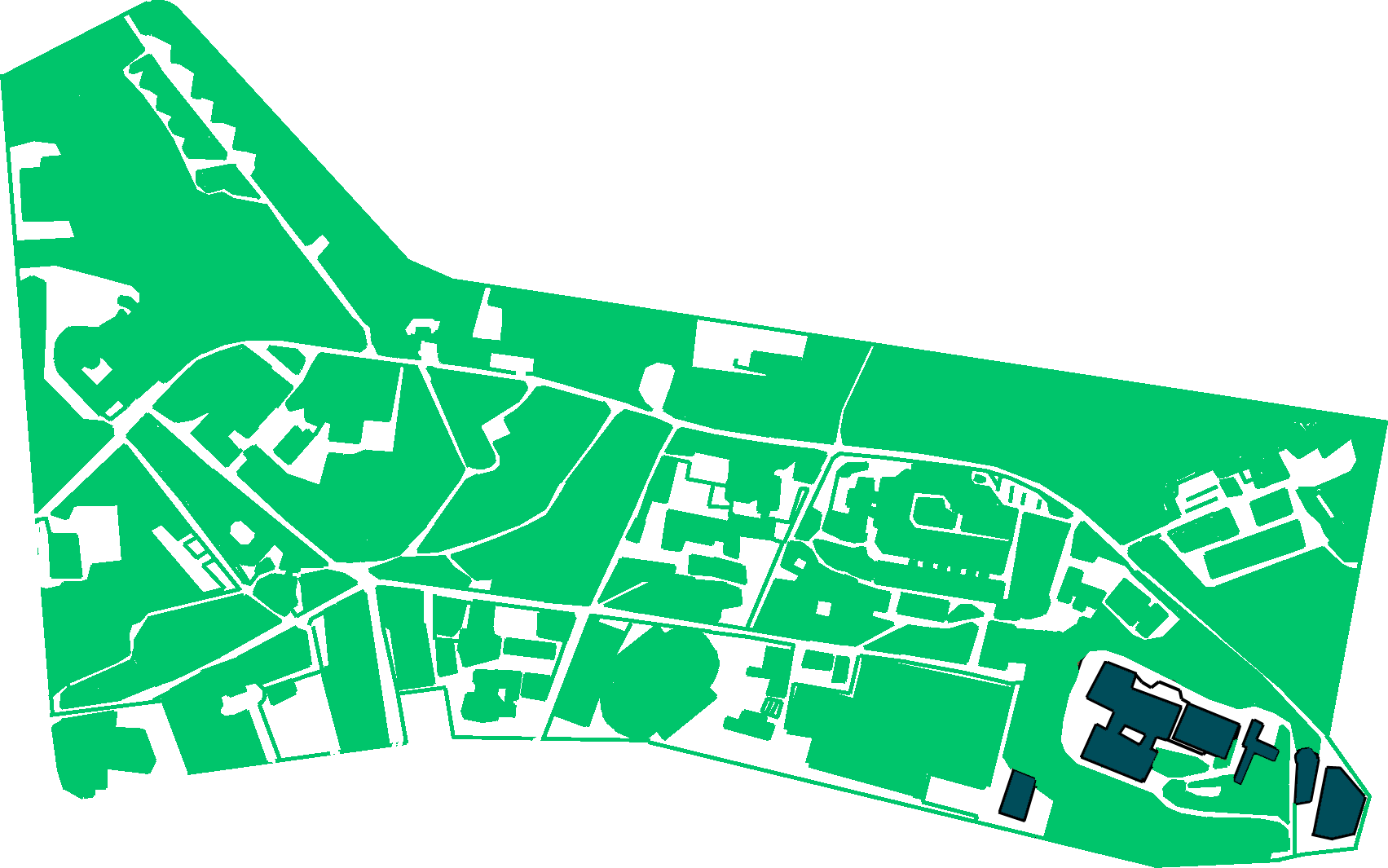
Position of the hospital on the University of Jordan campus map.

Plans for the hospital began in the early 1970s as part of the expansion of Jordan's healthcare infrastructure. The facility opened its doors to the public in 1973 under the name "Great Amman Hospital" (Arabic: مستشفى عمان الكبير). In 1975, a national law came into effect merging the hospital with the University of Jordan, after which it became known as Jordan University Hospital. This affiliation made JUH the country's first academic teaching hospital, providing a platform for medical education and training linked to the university. The hospital's mission shifted to include teaching and research for the health professions.

Throughout the subsequent decades, Jordan University Hospital expanded its capacity and services to meet growing healthcare needs. By the 2000s it had over 500 beds and was treating tens of thousands of inpatients per year, in addition to a large outpatient workload. While primarily serving the population of Amman, the hospital also began admitting significant numbers of patients from neighboring countries such as Iraq, Palestine, Egypt, and Yemen.

== Facilities and services ==
JUH operates clinical departments across major medical and surgical specialties, including internal medicine, general and special surgery, pediatrics, obstetrics and gynecology, dentistry, radiology and nuclear medicine, anesthesia and intensive care, emergency medicine, medical laboratory and forensic medicine, and physical medicine and rehabilitation. In 2019, the president of the University of Jordan said the hospital employed 850 nurses.

JUH provides a range of tertiary and subspecialty services. A 2024 study conducted at the hospital described its pediatric cardiology unit as having expanded in staff and capacity over several decades. The hospital also lists subspecialty surgical services such as cochlear implantation under its Department of Special Surgery. Among its clinical units, JUH maintains a Neurophysiology Unit with services that include epilepsy evaluation and pre-surgical assessment, according to the hospital's unit description. The hospital also operates a bone marrow transplant unit; the hospital states that the unit began performing transplants in 1987.

JUH provides diagnostic and treatment services supported by radiology, nuclear medicine, operating theatres, and clinical laboratories. The hospital's radiology and nuclear medicine services include MRI and CT imaging, as well as other diagnostic imaging modalities. Its surgical departments list minimally invasive procedures such as laparoscopic surgery among their clinical services. The hospital also maintains medical laboratory services as part of its clinical support departments.

== Academic and training role ==
As a teaching hospital, JUH provides clinical training for students in health-related programs at the University of Jordan and supports postgraduate medical training. A 2025 document about the hospital's Education, Training and Development Office describes training for "students of medical and health colleges" and follow-up of residency training as part of its remit. The hospital also publishes lists of training and rehabilitation programs offered to University of Jordan students.

JUH provides postgraduate medical training through higher-specialization (residency) programs affiliated with the University of Jordan. The University's School of Graduate Studies lists higher-specialization programs in multiple clinical specialties, including internal medicine, general surgery, obstetrics and gynecology, pediatrics, diagnostic radiology, emergency medicine, anesthesia and intensive care, otolaryngology, neurosurgery, and others. The School of Medicine describes the internal medicine residency as a four-year program with clinical training and research opportunities, and the Department of Obstetrics and Gynecology reports a five-year higher-specialization track with residents progressing by year.

JUH also runs continuing education and training activities through its Education, Training and Development Office (established in 2021), which organizes courses and workshops and offers programs accredited for continuing professional development hours by Jordanian councils. The hospital additionally operates a Clinical Trials Research Office; the hospital states that its clinical research site was established in 2014.

== Departments ==
=== Medical departments ===
Below are the key medical departments at Jordan University Hospital:

- Department of Special Surgery
- Department of Internal Medicine
- Department of General Surgery
- Department of Pediatrics
- Department of Obstetrics & Gynecology
- Department of Dentistry
- Department of Radiology & Nuclear Medicine
- Department of Anesthesia & Intensive Care / ICU
- Medical Laboratory & Forensic Medicine
- Accident & Emergency / Emergency Department
- Physical Medicine & Rehabilitation

=== Nursing department ===
The Department of Nursing at Jordan University Hospital (JUH) has a team of over 800 nurses delivering specialized services across various medical needs, from premature newborns to trauma and critical care patients.

== Specialized medical services ==
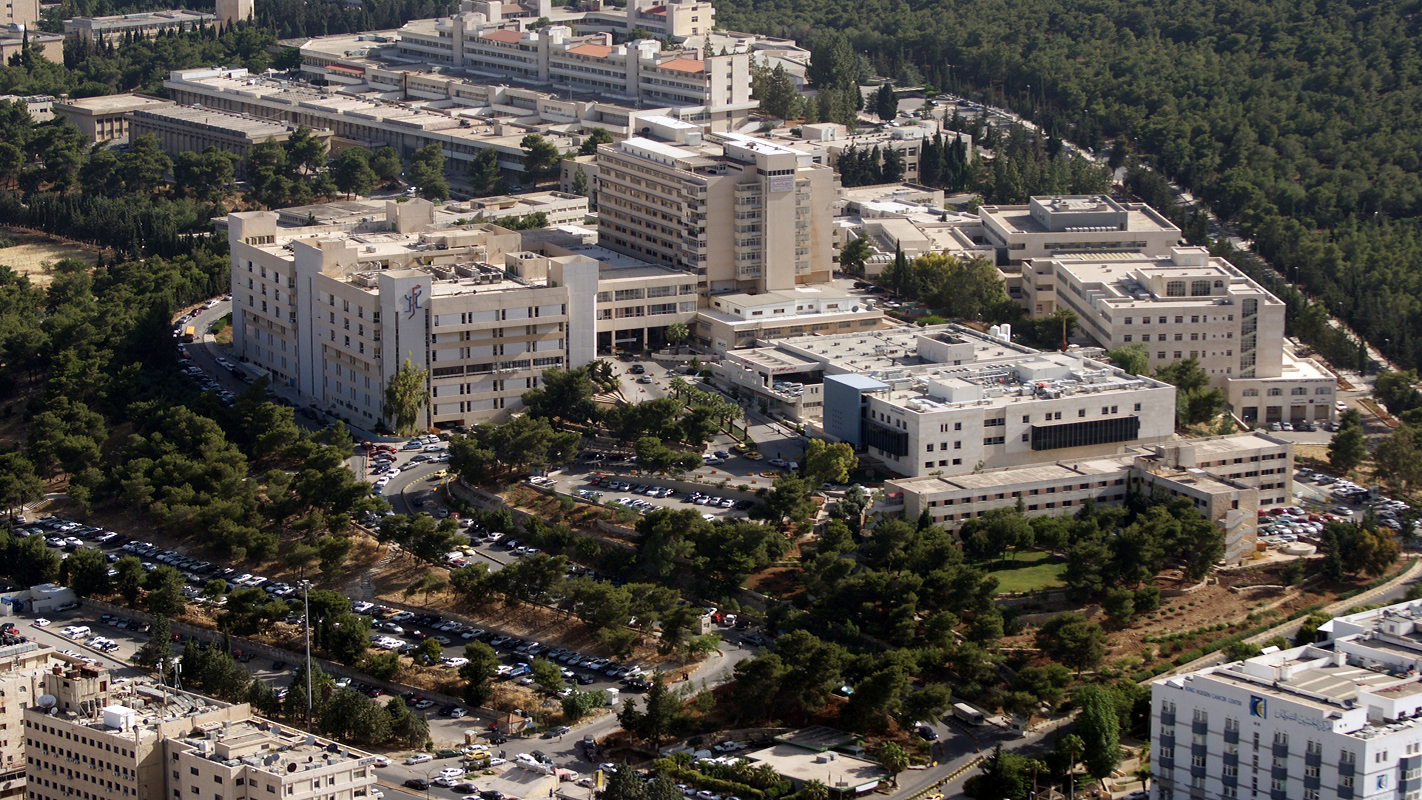
Aerial image capturing the University Hospital building from above.

The hospital's expertise covers various specialties, particularly focusing on surgical and medical treatments. Some notable achievements include innovative surgical interventions for conditions such as epilepsy, brain tumors, and cerebral vascular malformations. Additionally, JUH provides complex procedures like cochlear implants, plastic surgery, and bone marrow transplants. Specialized services are also available in areas such as gastrointestinal endoscopy, bariatric surgery, infertility treatment, high-risk pregnancy care, and sleep disorders management.

JUH offers a large range of advanced medical procedures aimed at improving patient health and well-being.

=== Therapeutic services ===
Patients at JUH have access to a diverse range of therapeutic services.

=== Medical equipment ===
The hospital is equipped with medical technology, including imaging systems and specialized surgical instruments.

== Certifications ==
Alongside its Joint Commission International accreditation, JUH has received renewed certification from the International Organization for Standardization, the Hazard Analysis and Critical Control Points (HACCP), and the Health Care Accreditation Council (HCAC).

== Future directions ==
Due to the demand for medical tourism, JUH has expanded its facilities to include a section of private suites with medical and hospitality services.

== Sources ==
- Dew, P.; Wallace, A.J. (2004). Doing Business with Jordan. Doing Business With Series. Blue Ibex Limited. ISBN 978-1-905050-58-1.
- Jordan. Wizārat al-Iʻlām (1978). Health Services in Jordan. The Ministry. p. 91.
- Hayajneh, Ferial A. Teaching Nursing Practice at Jordanian Universities (PDF). ProQuest (Ph.D. thesis). Glasgow University. pp. 32–34.
- Jordan Surveillance of Antimicrobial Resistance: Annual Report 2024 (PDF) (Report). Ministry of Health (Jordan). October 2025.
- Prevention and management of mental health conditions in Jordan: The case for investment (PDF) (Report). World Health Organization. 2024. pp. 23–24.
- National Registry of End Stage Renal Disease (ESRD): 11th Annual Report 2018 (PDF) (Report). Ministry of Health (Jordan). 2018. p. 6.
- Halahleh, Khalid; Sarhan, Mahmoud M.; Gale, Robert Peter (2019). "Hematopoietic cell transplants in Jordan: different indications from the US and EU". Bone Marrow Transplantation. 54 (9): 1379–1381. doi:10.1038/s41409-019-0578-1.
- Younis, Wejdan Othman (2022). "Feasibility and clinical utility of the Critical-Care Pain Observation Tool (CPOT) among nurses at a teaching hospital in Jordan". Nursing Practice Today. 9 (2): 114–124.
- Jaber, Deema J.; Basheer, Haneen A. (2022). "Prevalence and predictive factors for infertility-related stress among infertile couples: A cross-sectional study from Jordan and the occupied Palestinian territories". Saudi Medical Journal. 43 (10): 1149–1156. doi:10.15537/smj.2022.43.10.20220411. PMC 9994507. PMID 36261208.
- Amarin, Marzouq N. (2023). "Body contouring after bariatric surgeries in Jordan: Awareness, prevalence, and challenges: A multicentric cross-sectional study". Medicine (Baltimore). 102 (33) e34279. doi:10.1097/MD.0000000000034279. PMC 10443752. PMID 37603527.
- Zuriekat, Margaret (2024). "Hearing Loss in Jordan: an Overlooked Public Health Challenge". Jordan Medical Journal. 58 (3): 357–372. doi:10.35516/jmj.v58i3.3244.

== See also ==
- Healthcare in Jordan
- University of Jordan
- King Hussein Cancer Center
- King Hussein Medical Center
- Princess Haya Biotechnology Center (PHBC)
