= Princess Haya Biotechnology Center =

Jordanian research center

Princess Haya Biotechnology Center (PHBC)
- Established: 2005
- Research type: Biotechnology, Public health, Pharmaceuticals, National security
- Director: Dr. Laith N Al-Eitan
- Location: Ar Ramtha, Jordan
- Operating agency: Jordan University of Science and Technology (JUST)
- Website: JUST-PHBC

The Princess Haya Biotechnology Center (PHBC) houses 16 research laboratories and supports scientific activity at the national and regional level. It was established at the Jordan University of Science and Technology (JUST) on the campus of King Abdullah University Hospital (KAUH) in 2005. ٍDr. Laith Al-Eitan is the director of the center, Princess Haya serves as Honorary President.

As well as local cooperation with universities and hospitals in the country, the center has expanded its activity beyond the national borders, liaising with a forensic medicine institute in Iraq, the Saint Joseph University in Lebanon, the Hamdan Bin Rashid Organisation for Excellence in the UAE, the Human Genetics Center at the University of Humboldt in Germany, the Forensic Medicine Center at the University of Western Australia, and Sandia National Laboratories in the USA.
