= Health in Jordan =

Jordanian healthcare

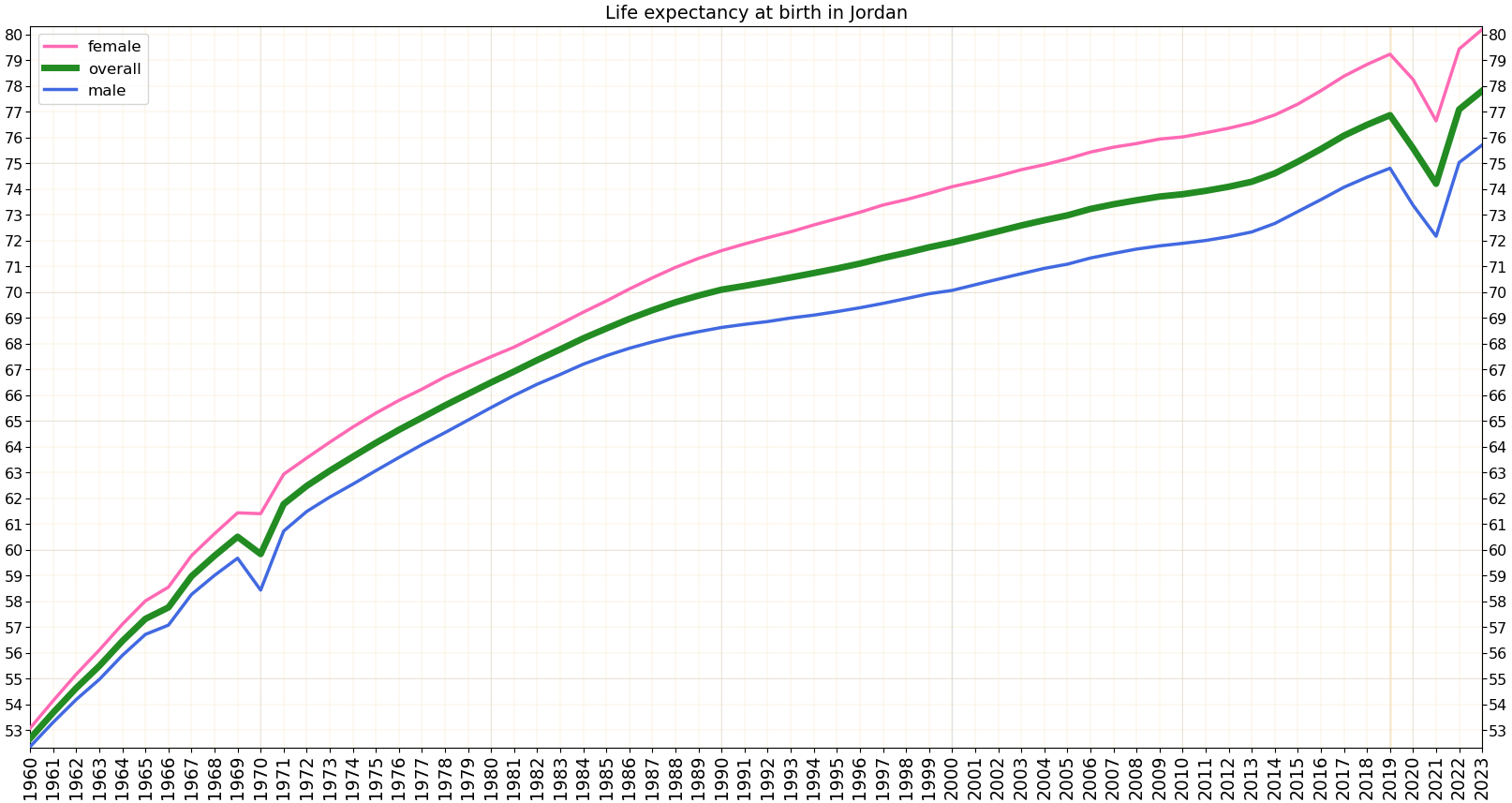
Life expectancy in Jordan

Life expectancy in Jordan was 74 years in 2021. 99% of Jordan's population have access to clean water and sanitation despite it being one of the world's poorest in water resources. There were 203 physicians per 100,000 people in the years 2000–2004, a proportion comparable to many developed countries and higher than most of the developing world.

According to 2003 estimates, the rate of prevalence of human immunodeficiency virus/acquired immune deficiency syndrome (HIV/AIDS) was less than 0.1 percent. According to a United Nations Development Program report, Jordan has been considered malaria-free since 2001; cases of tuberculosis declined by half during the 1990s, but tuberculosis remains an issue and an area needing improvement. Jordan experienced a brief outbreak of bird flu in March 2006. Noncommunicable diseases such as cancer also are a major health issue in Jordan. Childhood immunization rates have increased steadily over the past 15 years; by 2002 immunizations and vaccines reached more than 95 percent of children under five.

The Human Rights Measurement Initiative finds that Jordan is fulfilling 79.5% of what it should be fulfilling for the right to health based on its level of income. When looking at the right to health with respect to children, Jordan achieves 97.2% of what is expected based on its current income. In regards to the right to health amongst the adult population, the country achieves 94.0% of what is expected based on the nation's level of income. Jordan falls into the "bad" category when evaluating the right to reproductive health because the nation is fulfilling only 47.3% of what the nation is expected to achieve based on the resources (income) it has available.

== Health care ==
Jordan has an advanced health care system, although services remain highly concentrated in Amman. Government figures have put total health spending in 2002 at some 7.5 percent of gross domestic product (GDP), while international health organizations place the figure even higher, at approximately 9.3 percent of GDP. Jordan was ranked by the World Bank to be the number one medical tourism provider in the Arab region and among the top 5 in the world, as well as being the top medical tourism destination in the Middle East and North Africa.

The country’s health care system is divided between public and private institutions. In the public sector, the Ministry of Health operates 1,245 primary health care centers and 27 hospitals, accounting for 37 percent of all hospital beds in the country; the military’s Royal medical Services runs 11 hospitals, providing 24 percent of all beds; and the Jordan University Hospital accounts for 3 percent of total beds in the country. The private sector provides 36 percent of all hospital beds, distributed among 56 hospitals.

== Electronic health records ==
In 2009, the Jordanian Government made a strategic decision to address quality and cost challenges in their healthcare system by investing in an effective, national e-health infrastructure. Following a period of detailed consultation and investigation, Jordan adopted the electronic health record system of the US Veterans Health Administration VistA EHR because it was a proven, national-scale enterprise system capable of scaling to hundreds of hospitals and millions of patients. VistA in Jordan | Campaign for NHS VistA In 2010 three of the country's largest hospitals went live with VistA EHR. It is anticipated that all further hospital deployments based on this 'gold' version will require less than 20% effort and cost of the original hospitals, enabling rapid national coverage. The implementation of VistA EHR was estimated at 75% less cost than proprietary products, with the greatest savings related to reduced costs of configuration, customization, implementation and support. When completed, Jordan will be the largest country in the world with a single, comprehensive, national electronic health care delivery network to care for the country's entire population in a single electronic network of over 850 hospitals and clinics.

See also Electronic health record

About 70% of Jordanians had medical insurance in 2007, the Jordanian government planned to reach 100% in 2011. However, in 2017, the Jordanian National Health Council reported that the health insurance coverage is still at 70%.

The King Hussein Cancer Center is the only specialized cancer treatment facility in the Middle East. It is one of the top cancer treatment facilities in the world attracting patients from around the world, even from the west.

== Medical Tourism ==
In 2008, 250,000 patients sought treatment in the Kingdom including Iraqis, Palestinians, Sudanese, Syrians, GCC citizens, Americans, Canadians, and Egyptians. Jordan generated over $1 billion in 2008 from medical tourism.

Jordan is an emerging medical tourism destination, with related revenues exceeding one billion dollars in 2007. More than 250,000 patients from other countries sought treatment in Jordan that year. This included an approximately 45,000 Iraqis, 25,000 Palestinians, 25,000 Sudanese, 1,800 US citizens, 1,200 UK citizens, and 400 Canadians. Treatment costs can be as low as 25 percent of costs in the US. The World Bank ranked Jordan as being the top medical tourism destination in the Middle East and North Africa, followed by Dubai, Abu Dhabi, and Israel.

== See also ==
- King Abdullah University Hospital
- List of hospitals in Jordan
- Medical education in Jordan
- Private Hospitals Association (Jordan)
