= Jordan University of Science and Technology =

Public university in Ar-Ramtha, Jordan

- جَامِعَةُ العلوم والتكنولوجيا الأردنية
- Jordan University of Science and Technology Logo
- Type: Public
- Established: 1986
- Affiliations: IAU, FUIW; UNIMED, AArU; ICARDA, WHO; CIDA, ICGEB; ICTP, DAAD
- Budget: $150 million (JOD 102 million) (2019)
- President: Khalid El-Salem
- Academic staff: 1037
- Students: 30,042 (2023)
- Undergraduates: 28,424 (2023)
- Postgraduates: 1,618 (2023)
- Location: Al Ramtha, Irbid, Jordan
- Campus: Urban 1.41 square kilometres (350 acres)
- Colors: Violet and Blue ^{[a]}
- Nickname: JUST / Techno
- Website: www.just.edu.jo

The Jordan University of Science and Technology (Arabic: جامعة العلوم والتكنولوجيا الأردنية Jami'at Al-Ulum wa Al-Tiknolojia Al-Urdunia), often abbreviated JUST, is a public technological university located on the outskirts of Irbid, at Ar Ramtha in northern Jordan. The university comprises twelve faculties that offer a spectrum of undergraduate and higher study programs, in addition to King Abdullah University Hospital which is a tertiary teaching hospital affiliated with JUST and located within its campus.

== History ==
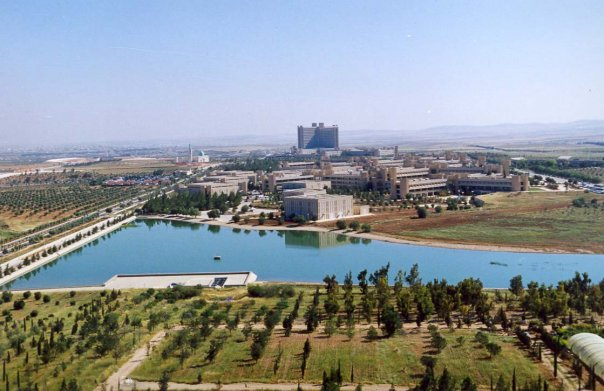
The university reservoir as seen with the Engineering Buildings Complex in the background.

Having its roots at Yarmouk University in Irbid, a royal decree was issued in 1986 to establish JUST, which emerged as an independent university on 1 September 1986. JUST detached five faculties from Yarmouk University to form its academic nucleus. These faculties were the Faculty of Medicine, the Faculty of Dentistry, the Faculty of Pharmacy, the Faculty of Nursing, and the Faculty of Engineering. Subsequently added to these faculties were the Faculty of Science and Arts, the Faculty of Applied Medical Sciences, the Faculty of Veterinary Medicine, the Faculty of Computer and Information Technology, and the Faculty of Agriculture.

Started with 110 faculty members, JUST in 2018 hosted 985 academic faculty members, of which 249 were full professors. A total of 2,300 students enrolled in 1986, but as of the academic year 2017/2018, 22634 undergraduate and 2213 postgraduate students were enrolled at the university, representing 51 nationalities. The university granted 5177 Bachelor and Master Degrees in the academic year 2017/2018, with a total of over 77,000 graduates since establishment.

== University Presidents ==
- Kamel Ajlouni (1986–1995)
- Saad Hijazi (1995–2003)
- Wajih Owais (2003–2010)
- Abdullah Al-Malkawi (2010–2014)
- Mahmoud Alsheyab (2015–2016)
- Omar Al-Jarrah (2016–2018)
- Saeb Khresat (2018– 2021)
- Khalid El-Salem (2021-now)

== Campus ==
The university campus is located in Ar Ramtha, 70 km north of Amman, the capital, and 20 km east of Irbid. It covers an area of approximately 11,000 dunums (11 km^{2}). The main campus is surrounded by a green cover of 5,000 dunums. In addition to academic buildings and the JUST Library, the campus includes the university farm, 12 auditoriums, a concert hall, fine arts galleries and museums, as well as athletic facilities.

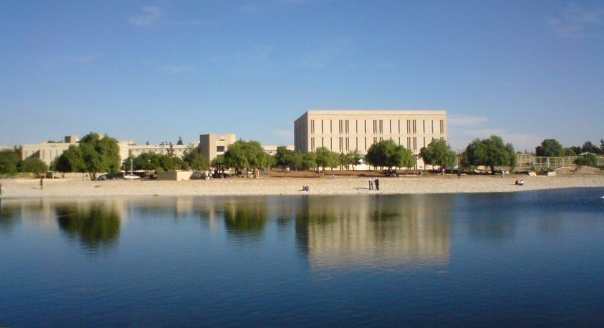
The university reservoir at The Engineering Faculties Complex.

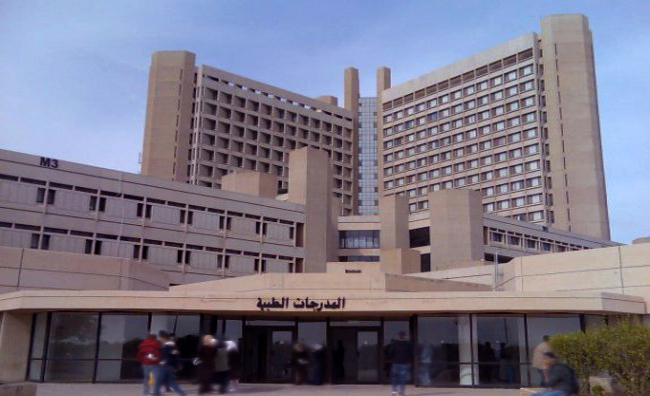
Medical halls of JUST as seen with KAUH.

The university campus is divided into two sections. The Medical Faculties Complex is located at the northern part of the university and houses the faculties of Dentistry, Medicine, Nursing, Applied Medical Sciences, Pharmacy and Science and Arts. The Engineering Faculties Complex is located at the southern part of the university and includes the faculties of Agriculture, Computer and Information Technology, Engineering, Architecture and Design and Veterinary Medicine.

There are two libraries in JUST, one in the Engineering Faculties Complex and the other is in the Medical Faculties Complex. The two-floor library at the Medical Faculties Complex contains 115,000 books, and 45,000 volumes of back issues of periodicals, which makes it the main library at the university. At the present time, a third library is being constructed in the area between the Engineering Faculties Complex and the Medical Faculties Complex which is larger in size than both existing libraries. There are three restaurants for students; one in each main campus, and one located near the soccer stadium.

Every department has a computer laboratory for the students to use. There are also two open labs one in each campus and six additional labs, which are available for the graduate and undergraduate computer science students and students who are taking related courses at the PH building located at the Medicine Faculties Building. The campus is covered by a wireless internet connection (WLAN).

=== King Abdullah University Hospital ===
Named after the first king of modern Jordan, Abdullah I bin al-Hussein, the King Abdullah University Hospital (KAUH) is the largest hospital in northern Jordan, serving approximately one million inhabitants of the Irbid, Ajloun, Jerash, and Mafraq governorates. It is also the teaching hospital affiliated with Jordan University of Science and Technology, located within the campus adjacent to the university's Medical Faculties Complex. The hospital is staffed with full-time physicians and surgeons who are faculty members of the JUST Faculty of Medicine, in addition to many others from the Ministry of Health, and the Royal Medical Services (RMS). The overall area of various hospital buildings is 95583m², in addition to a double story car park of 9000m² area. The hospital has a bed capacity of 683 which can be increased to 800 beds in an emergency situation.

Structurally, the hospital is composed of a 15-storey high-rise building, in which all hospital beds are located, and a 3-story low-rise buildings in which patient clinics, diagnostic and other services are located. The hospital is connected to various health science faculties via the ground floor of the low-rise building. The hospital includes the departments of General Surgery, Special Surgery, Emergency Department, Pediatrics, Obstetrics and Gynecology, Internal Medicine and Dermatology, Cardiac Center, Diagnostic X-Ray, Pathology and Laboratory, Endoscopy Unit, Physical Therapy and Rehabilitation, Physiology Function Test, Neuroscience, Nursing and Information System Department.

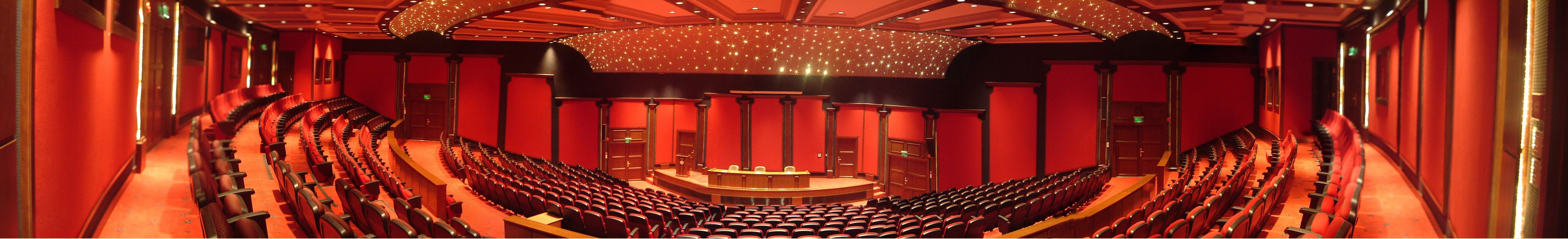
The Red Hall in King Abdullah University Hospital, the teaching hospital of JUST. – Photo by Aymx

== Academics ==
Jordan University of Science and Technology is home to twelve faculties. The language of teaching at the university is English, although most of the students speak Arabic.

=== Medical Faculties Complex ===
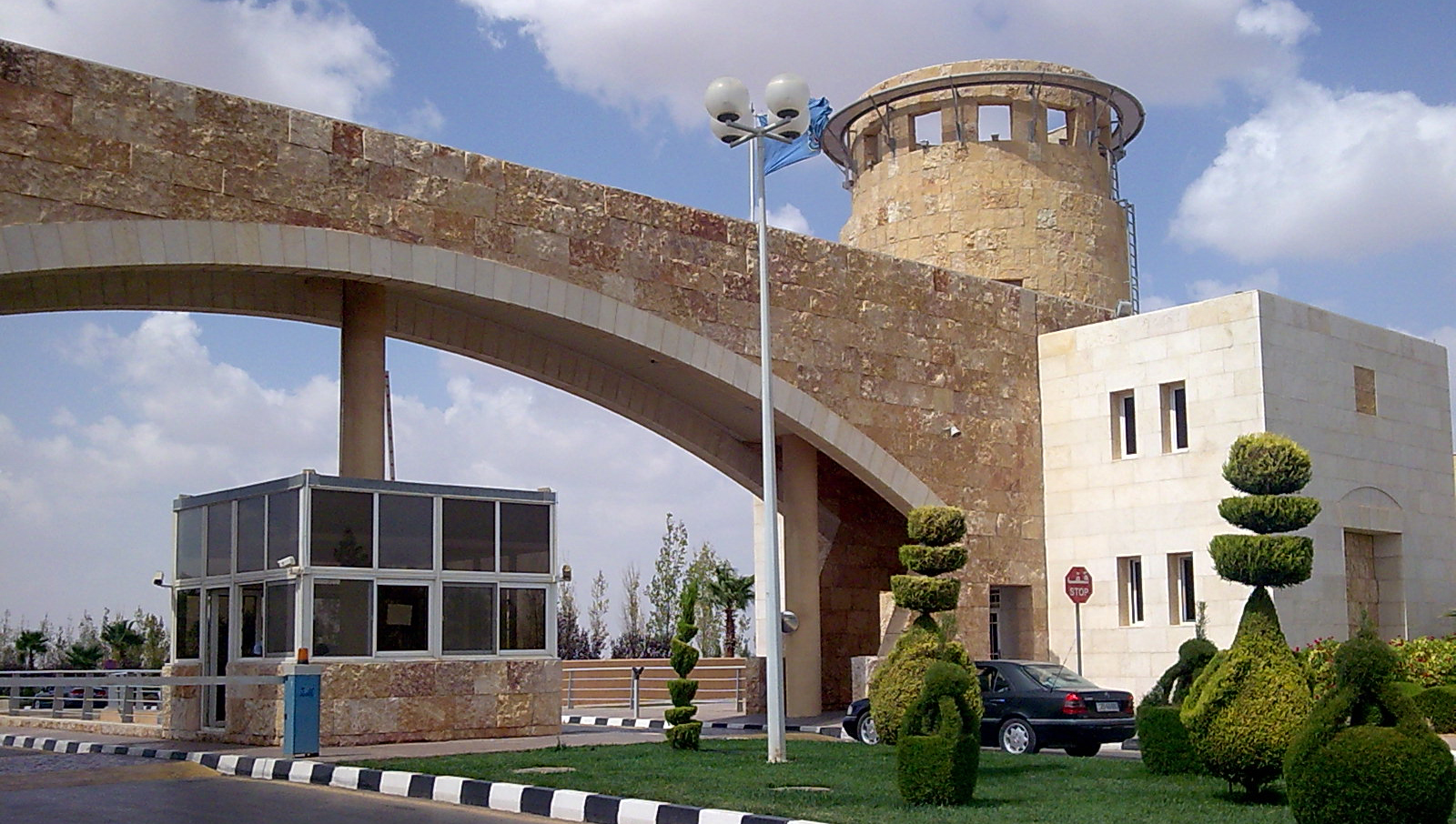
The main entrance to the JUST campus.

A group of building in the northern part of the university comprising the faculties of Medicine, Dentistry, Pharmacy, Nursing, Applied Medical Sciences, and Science and Arts.

==== Medicine ====
The JUST Faculty of Medicine, the second medical school in Jordan, was established in Yarmouk University at the northern city of Irbid in 1984; the faculty then branched out into Jordan University of Science and Technology in 1986. The faculty is closely associated with King Abdullah University Hospital, the teaching hospital where postgraduate students undergo their residencies. As the faculty's main teaching hospital, KAUH provide students with the opportunity to attend lectures, tutorials, clinics, ward rounds, and surgeries. Medical students graduating from JUST are widely renowned for their achievements in the United States Medical Licensing Examination (USMLE), gaining postgraduate positions in well-known global institutions. Furthermore, the Faculty of Medicine has been an active participant in medical research and has hosted numerous international events and conferences, with focus on subjects in relation to myocardial protection and research, pediatrics, anesthesia, and internal medicine. As of September 2011, the faculty will be hosting the Fellow of the Royal College of Pathologists (FRC Path) Part 1 written exams in all Pathology specialties, which will enable Jordanian and Arab Pathologists to sit the exam outside the UK.

===== Nature of the Medical Program =====
The Faculty of Medicine awards the Bachelor of Medicine and Surgery (MBBS) after completion of six years comprising three years of medical sciences and three clinical years. Students are admitted to medicine based solely on their grade point average in their high school national general exam (Tawjihi); there are neither entrance interviews nor psychometric exams. The cutoff average used for admissions into medicine is the highest among all the other disciplines offered by universities. For example, the cutoff average used over the past five years has been: 94.9 (2005), 96.3 (2006), 97 (2007), 96.8 (2008), and 97.7 (2009). Although in the minority, the faculty of medicine accepts students from Israel, Palestine, Syria, Arab states of the Persian Gulf, Malaysia, and other countries. Tuition is significantly higher for the foreign students. Initially, the faculty at JUST accepted 50 students into the program, but that number has grown to more than 200 in recent years.

During the first year and a half of their program, students are taught basic science in a traditional format. In an integrated module fashion, the next year and half is devoted to studying nine body systems: cardiovascular, respiratory, hematopoietic, digestive, endocrine, musculoskeletal, neuroscience 1 and 2, and reproductive and urinary. Towards the end of the third year students begin direct contact with patients in hospital settings. The last three years are spent in supervised inpatient and outpatient settings to develop their diagnostic and treatment competencies; the clinical years begin fully at the beginning of year 4 where students rotate through various areas of general clinical medicine. Year 5 continues this pattern focusing more on specialized areas of medicine and surgery. In total, students are required to complete 257 hours of classes divided among compulsory and elective courses. After completion of their 6th year, students are required to complete internship (imtiaz), which is a one-year term in general practice for which they are not compensated for.

Evaluations are based primarily on written exams (marks are based on two midterms and one end of term exam) and percentage grades appear on transcripts. Practical exams are solely based on an objective structured clinical examination (OSCE) type of standardized exams. In the final year, the school of medicine invites external examiners (from the United States, Britain, among others) to participate in student evaluations and to benefit from the experience of others.

===== Residency =====
Students looking to specialize can apply for residency programs after completion of imtiaz (internship). Most residency programs are four years in length, but notable exceptions include neurosurgery (6 years), general surgery (5 years), orthopedic surgery (5 years), and urology (5 years). Residency programs are divided into two broad groups: major and minor specialties. Major programs include internal medicine, pediatrics, obstetrics and gynecology, while the rest are considered minor. This division reflects the number of available seats and thus the competitiveness of each specialty. Faculty of Medicine

==== Dentistry ====
The Faculty of Dentistry at Jordan University of Science and Technology was founded by a royal decree on 16 September 1983 and the first group of students was admitted in the academic year 1984/1985. The faculty offers facilities for undergraduate and postgraduate training and is developing programs for all professionals in dentistry who wish to continue their education and obtain further qualifications. Faculty of Dentistry

==== Pharmacy ====
The Faculty of Pharmacy, the first in Jordan, was established as a department of the Faculty of Medical Sciences at Yarmouk University by a royal decree in 1979. The rapid growth and development of the department led to the transformation of the department into an independent faculty on 19 September 1983. Three years later -in September 1986– the Faculty of Pharmacy became affiliated with JUST. Faculty of Pharmacy

==== Nursing ====
The Faculty of Nursing was established in 1983 with only 2 faculty members and 23 students. It currently consists of 23 PhD, and 22 Masters prepared faculty members (Adult, Maternal Child, Community & Midwifery) placed in the four departments of the faculty; this body is supported by 27 MSN or BSN qualified clinical trainers. Faculty of Nursing

==== Applied Medical Sciences ====
The Faculty of Applied Medical Sciences was established in 2000, and was housed in several makeshift facilities. It was created to educate allied health professionals to fill crucial shortages in the health care needs of the people in Jordan. The faculty has since become a dynamic and vital member of the university health team. The faculty also has a number of sponsored students who are pursuing graduate studies leading to M.Sc. and Ph.D. degrees in various majors at well-known universities in the US, UK, and Australia. Upon graduation, they will join the faculty. Faculty of Applied Medical Sciences

==== Science and Arts ====
The Faculty of Science and Arts was established by a decree from the Council of Higher Education on 26 January 1987. It commenced its duties as of 1 September 1987. The faculty, one of the oldest and largest at the university, holds seven departments and a program of forensic science, offers both bachelor's and master's degrees and gives students the chance to choose from a plethora of disciplines that employ several pedagogical approaches involving classroom instruction, independent research, student-as-teacher approach, and internships or practical experience. Faculty of Science and Arts

=== Engineering Faculties Complex ===
32°29′33″N 35°59′14″E

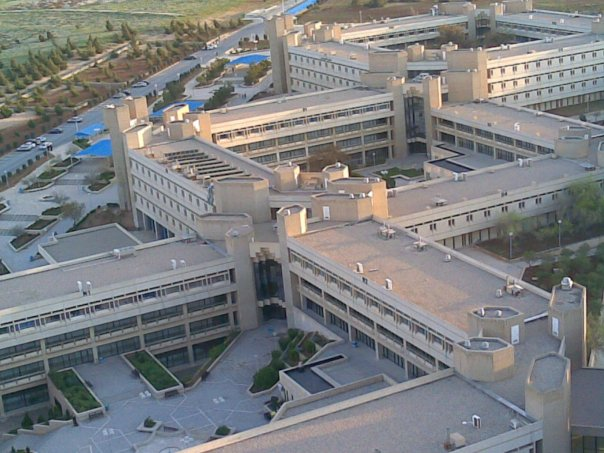
The Medical Faculties Complex.

This is a group of buildings in the southern part of the university housing the faculties of Engineering, Agriculture, Information Technology, Architecture and Design, Veterinary Medicine, and Graduate Studies.

==== Engineering ====
The Faculty of Engineering is the largest faculty in the university, with its 61 research and teaching labs. It comprises the departments of Biomedical Engineering, Aeronautical Engineering, Chemical Engineering, Civil Engineering, Electrical Engineering, Industrial Engineering, Mechanical Engineering power and mechatronics, and Nuclear Engineering. The Faculty takes part and is accredited by the United States Engineering Accreditation Commission (EAC) of (ABET).

==== Agriculture ====
The Faculty of Agriculture was established by a royal decree on 2 October 1985. Study began at the faculty in 1989/1990 with 71 students, to grow into over 1100 students in the academic year 2006/2007, including 100 graduate students. The faculty began with only nine faculty members upon its establishment. Currently, the number has increased into 48 faculty members in four academic departments.

==== Information Technology ====
The Faculty of Information Technology was established in 2000. The Faculty consists of eight departments: Computer Engineering, Computer Science, Computer Information System, Software Engineering,Network Engineering, cyber security, Data science and Artificial intelligence

==== Architecture and Design ====
The Faculty of Architecture and Design awards both bachelor's degrees and master's degrees and comprises the departments of architecture and urban planning. It participates yearly in the Arab Architectural Graduation Project Exhibition, which started as Bilad Al Sham Graduation Project Exhibition.

==== Veterinary Medicine ====
The Faculty of Veterinary Medicine was established at JUST in 1990 as a response to the national objective of improving animal health and productivity by increasing their efficiency and thereby reducing the cost of animal production. It is the only Faculty of Veterinary Medicine in Jordan. It also houses a Veterinary Health Center (VHC), which serves the purpose of clinical training for students and provides veterinary services to the public. The faculty is a research and a consultative center, in addition to its basic function in promoting and sustaining high standards of undergraduate and postgraduate programs. The faculty is an active member of the Arab Association of Veterinary Medical Faculties and it houses its office.

==== Graduate Studies ====
The Faculty of Graduate Studies provides advanced studies in different fields including Medicine, Applied Medical Sciences, Science, Nursing, Dentistry, Pharmacy, Veterinary Medicine, Agriculture, Engineering and Computer Technology. The faculty is entrusted with setting the rules and regulations pertinent to graduate programs and degrees and pursuing the implementation of these regulations.

Each faculty is best known with a color:

Faculty of Agriculture	Faculty of Applied Medical Sciences	Faculty of Computer and Information Technology	Faculty of Dentistry	Faculty of Engineering	Faculty of Medicine	Faculty of Nursing	Faculty of Pharmacy	Faculty of Science and Arts	Faculty of Veterinary Medicine

=== Research ===
Since its establishment, JUST has given its utmost priority to academic research. In this vein, the Deanship of Research commenced its activities at the early stages of the university establishment during the academic year 1986/1987. Research, basic and applied, is amongst the principal priorities of the university. Training and supervision in research methodology, especially for postgraduate students, is reinforced by several research centers, such as the Queen Rania Center for Environmental Science and Technology, Consultative Center for Science and Technology, Energy Center, Pharmaceutical Research Center, Princess Haya Biotechnology Center, and the Agricultural Center for Research & Production.

Research funding has steadily grown since the establishment of JUST in 1986, and an average of 200 research projects are sponsored and funded each year. As testimony to this development, JUST was ranked as the top research university in Jordan, and amongst the top 3% universities in the Islamic world, according to a study carried out by the Ankara-based Statistical, Economic and Social Research and Training Center for Islamic Countries (SESRTCIC).

Nature Journal has reported Jordan as having the highest number of researchers in research and development per million people among all the 57 countries members of the Organisation of Islamic Cooperation (OIC). In Jordan there are 2,000 researchers per million people, while the average among the members of OIC is 500 researchers per million people. This means that the number of researchers per population in Jordan, is higher than Italy, Israel and Greece and just close to the number in United Kingdom and Ireland.

The Deanship of Research at JUST is the administrative and technical body that facilitates, regulates and observes the processes concerning research. It works in a collaborative and complementary manner with other faculties and administrative bodies of the university. Any research on humans should be approved by the Institutional Research Board (IRB) and any research on animals should be approved by the university Animal Care and Use Committee (ACUC) before being funded. Deanship of Research

=== Nuclear Science and Technology Center ===
In consistence with Jordan's efforts to develop and use nuclear energy for peaceful purposes and lessen its dependence on fossil fuel, and in co-ordinance with the Department of Nuclear Engineering of JUST, a nuclear research reactor, the first in the country, has been set to be built in the university campus which will serve as an integral part of the nuclear technology infrastructure of Jordan.

The five-megawatt (MW) nuclear research reactor, which was inaugurated in December 2016, will become the focal point for a Nuclear Science and Technology Center (NSTC) in JUST, playing the primary role in educating and training the upcoming generations of nuclear engineers and scientists, and providing irradiation services in support of the Jordanian industrial, agricultural and health/medical infrastructures.

The nuclear research reactor center will include radioisotope production and training facilities, future expansion of the center will include a fuel fabrication plant, as well as radioactive waste and cold neutron facilities. The reactor, which will be upgradeable to 10MW, will facilitate the training of nuclear operators and technicians as well as advanced nuclear research in neutron sciences and the commercial production of radioisotopes, it will also allow for practical experience for Jordanians in nuclear energy, reactor physics, radiochemistry and radiation protection. The research reactor is considered by Jordan Atomic Energy Commission (JAEC) officials to be an important precursor to Jordan's first nuclear power plant, a 750–1,000MW Generation III reactor to be built in an area in Mafraq 40 kilometers northeast of Amman and 15 kilometers away from the Hashemite University.

== Library ==
The library collection comprises 115,000 books, and 45,000 volumes of periodicals back issues. In organizing its collection, the Library adopts the Library of Congress Classification Scheme, and uses the Anglo-American Cataloging Rules (AACR2) and the International Standard of Bibliographic Description (ISBD).

The total floor area of the library is estimated as 12.500 square meters, and it can accommodate 2.500 visitors at the same time due to the large area that the library has.

To cope with the new technologies in the field of library and information science, the library started in 1993 to offer retrieved information services through a good number of necessary databases, which are published on CD-ROM or online (WAN) subscriptions.

The new library, which is set to become the largest library in the Middle East, under construction at JUST.

There are two libraries in JUST, one in the Engineering Faculties Complex and the other is in the Medical Faculties Complex. While both libraries give the students an appropriate and suitable place for reading and studying, the two-floor library at the Medical Faculties Complex is relatively larger, also contains 115,000 books, and 45,000 volumes of back issues of periodicals, which makes it the main library at the university. At the present time, a third library is being built in the area between the two complexes and is larger in size than both existing libraries and is set to become the largest library in the Middle East.

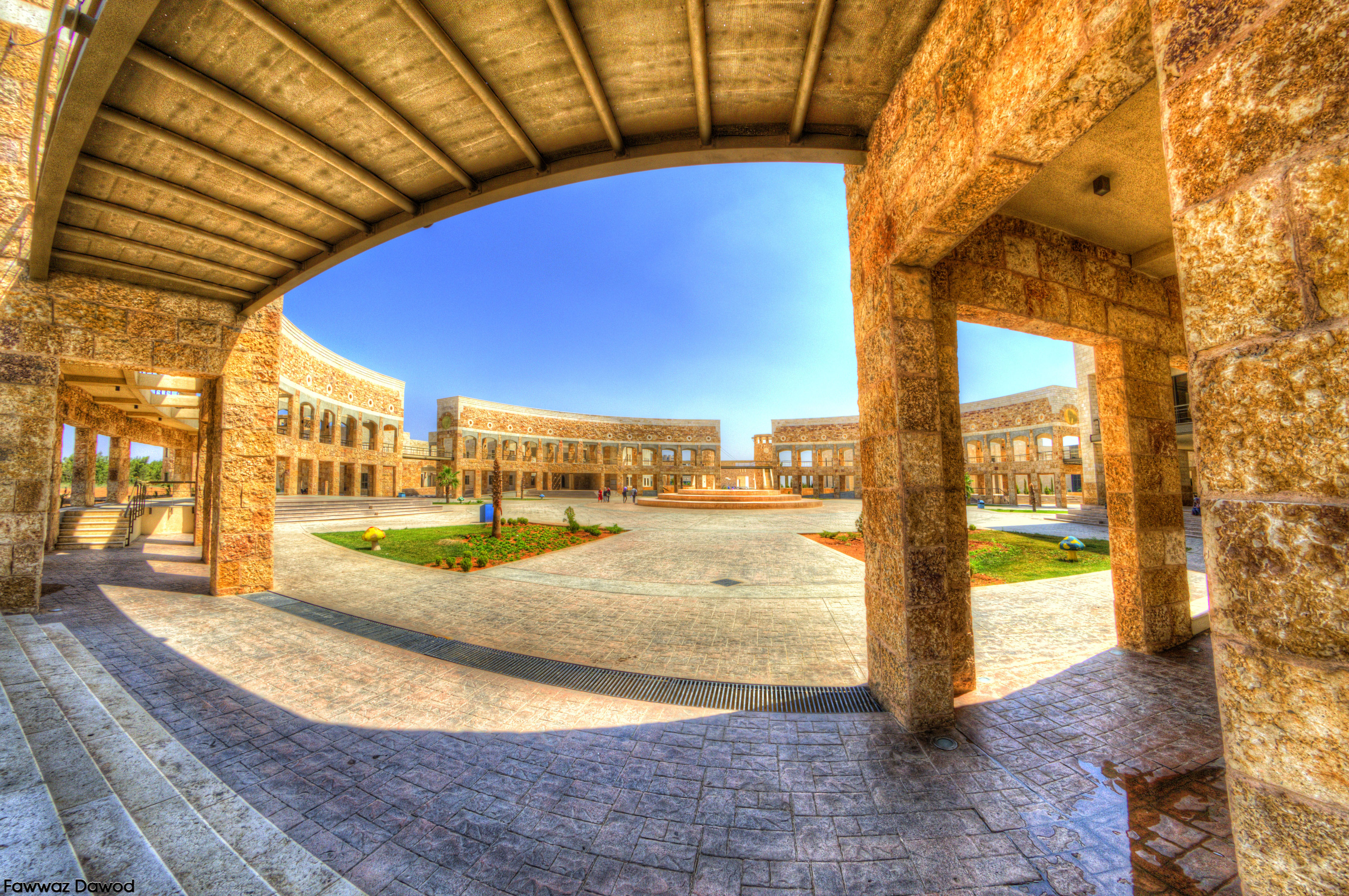
Largest library in the Middle East.

== Publications ==
The university issues a quarterly journal called the Jordan Journal of Civil Engineering (JJCE). The journal is internationally peer-reviewed. Subjects covered include applications of civil rehabilatations, structural control, smart materials, earthquake engineering, geotechnical engineering and soil/rock mechanics, dam engineering, traffic and transportation engineering, water and environmental engineering, construction management and project planning, surveying and mapping, and infrastructures engineering, as well as numerical and analytical methods.

The Deanship of Research is responsible for the funding of research publications by staff members and students, as well as managing the Jordan Journal of Civil Engineering.

== Student Newspaper ==
Just for Just, is an electronic newspaper initiated by the students of the university.

== Students ==
A students' union is elected annually to represent the students. Student clubs that are responsible for organizing various events throughout the academic year. Of the most prominent of these clubs are the Medical Club, Great Arab Revolt Club, Media Club, Science Club, International student Club, Chess Club, and Culture Club.

=== International community ===
The number of international students at JUST continues to rise; in the academic year 2005/2006, more than 3,500 students of 48 nationalities came from outside Jordan. As of the academic year 2009/2010, the university had 5,415 international students from 61 different nationalities, rendering it the most cultural-diverse university in Jordan. The International Student Office (ISO) was established in 2005 and is supervised directly by the president. Highly qualified coordinators and staff provide cultural, social and legal consultation, field trips, social events, and meetings with the president. An International Community Fair takes place annually at the university with the aim of encouraging and promoting cross-cultural communication and diversity in the workplace.

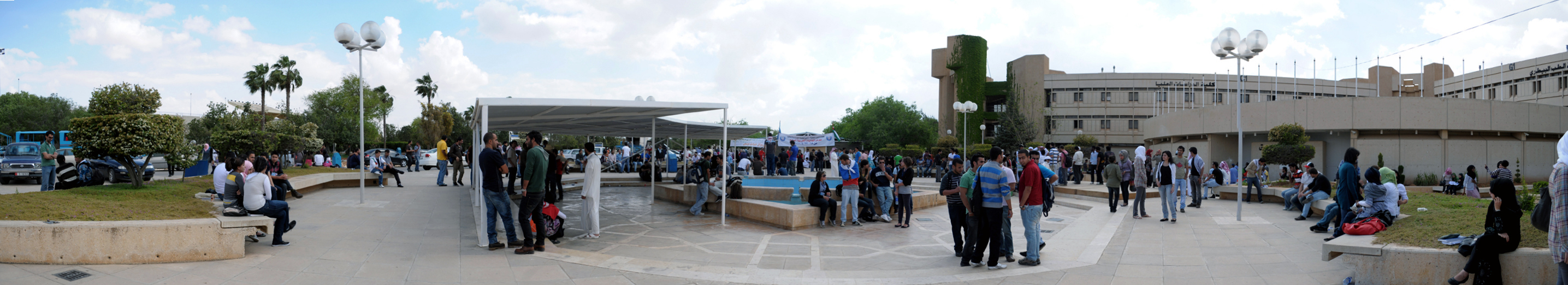
Panoramic photo of students in the Engineering Faculties Complex during the International Community Fair at Jordan University of Science and Technology. – Photo by Hassan Ali

=== Housing ===
==== On-campus housing ====
The first building was established in 1993. Due to increasing demand, the number of buildings was gradually raised to eight fully occupied buildings. Each building consists of four floors, the ground floor included. Each floor consists of two major wards, each of which contains eleven rooms, in addition to an adequate number of bathrooms and showers associated with each ward. Each building offers three types of rooms.

=== Health care and insurance ===
Health care is available to all students, the cost of which is included in the semester fees. It covers 100% of most services offered by the University Health Centers, including King Abdullah University Hospital (KAUH) and the JUST Health Center (HC). The university provides free life insurance coverage to all students. JUST Health Center (HC) in Irbid was established in 1983 to provide medical care to students, faculty and staff. It is also a teaching center for the residency program of family medicine.

== Faculty ==
- Kamel Ajlouni, endocrinologist and university president from 1986 to 1995.

== International affiliations ==
- Association of Arab Universities (AArU)
- International Association of Universities (IAU)
- Federation of the Universities of the Islamic World (FUIW)
- Mediterranean Universities Union (UNIMED)
- Royal Norwegian Commission
- IKIP/Malaysia
- International Center for Agricultural Research in the Dry Areas (ICARDA)
- World Health Organization (WHO)
- Canadian International Development Agency (CIDA)
- EU
- International Centre for Genetic Engineering and Biotechnology (ICGEB)
- UNESCO
- Alexander von Humboldt Foundation/Germany
- International Centre for Theoretical Physics/Italy
- German Academic Exchange Service (DAAD)
- The British Council/ODA
- The French Mission for Agriculture and Water (Fulbright)
- Cisco Systems
- Boscan International
- Microsoft
- IBM

== Photo gallery ==
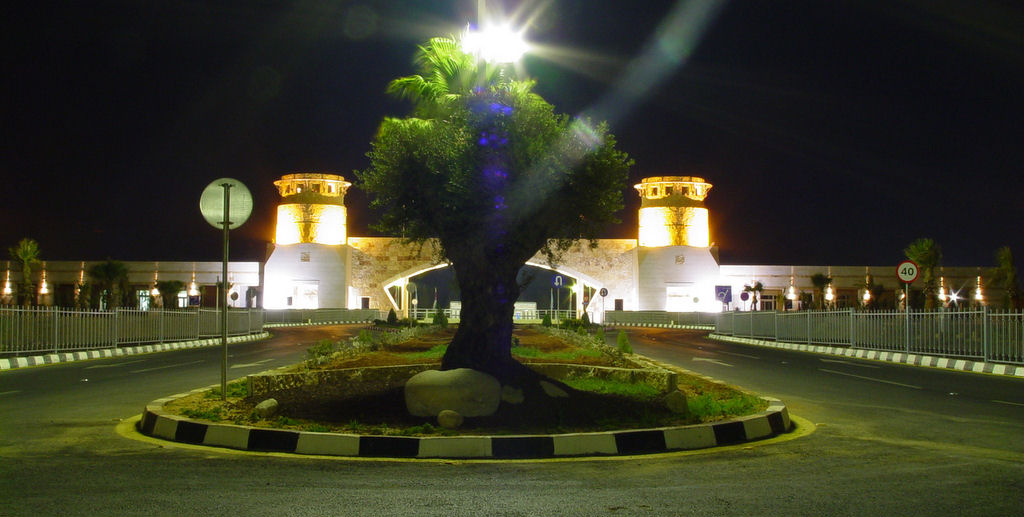
The main gate of JUST at night.

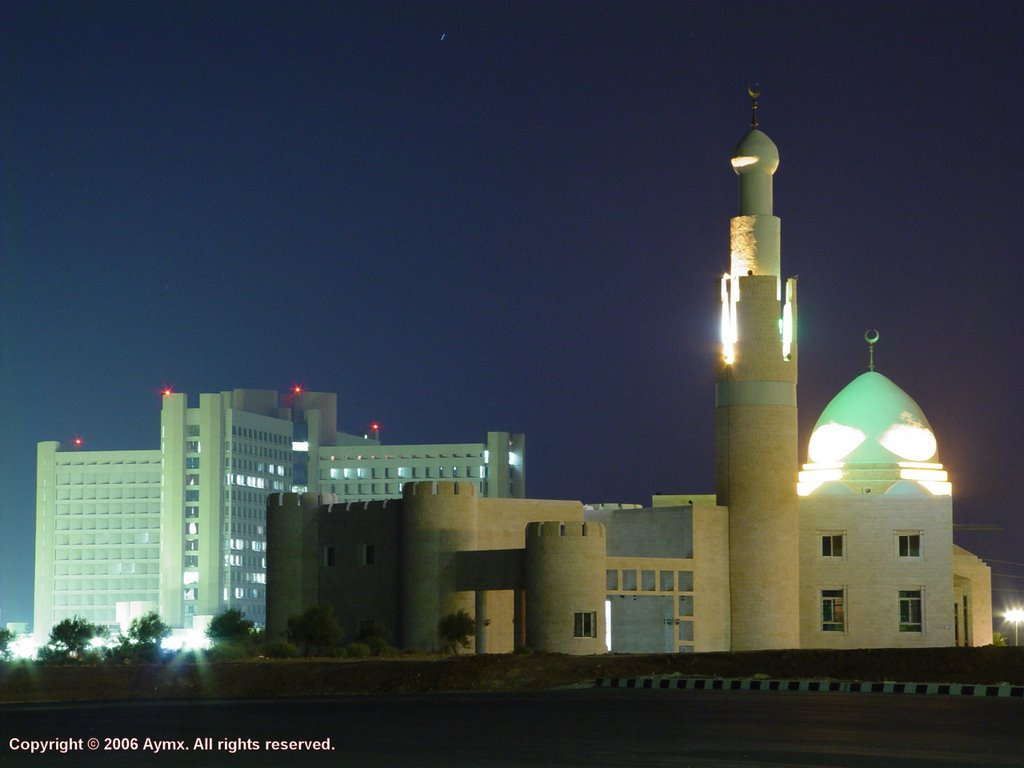
King Abdullah University Hospital and the mosque of JUST at night.

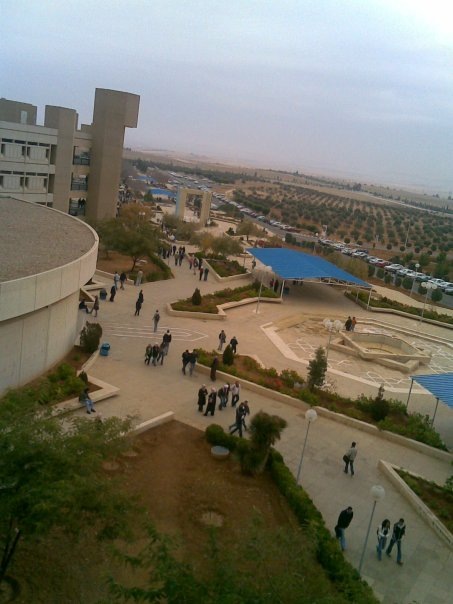
Science Hall 2 at the Medical Faculties Complex.

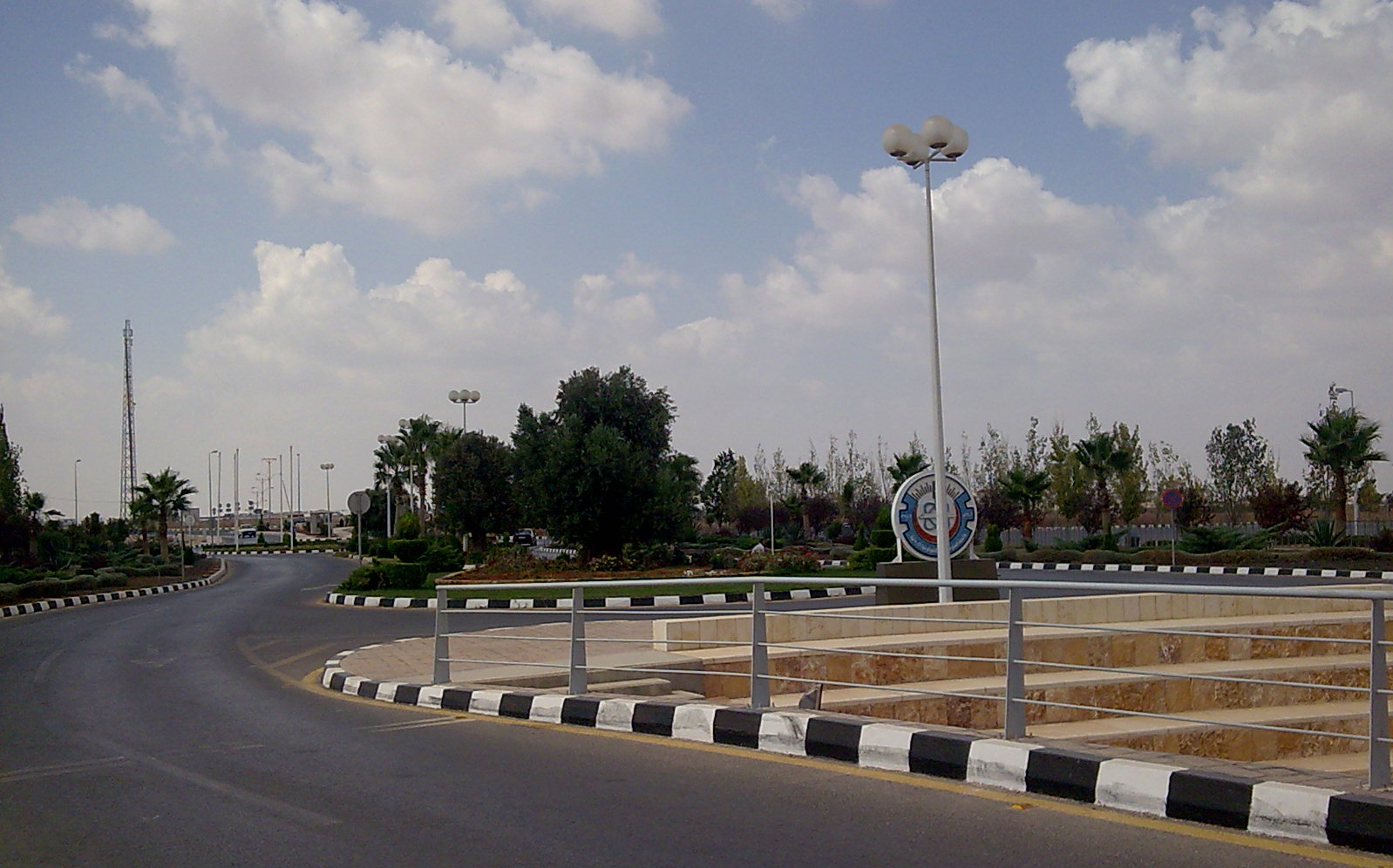
Entrance to JUST.

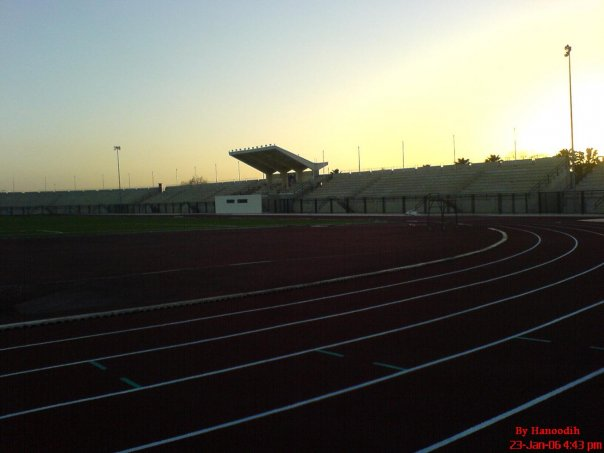
Stadium at the Engineering Faculties Complex.

Faculty of Information Technology at the Engineering Faculties Complex.

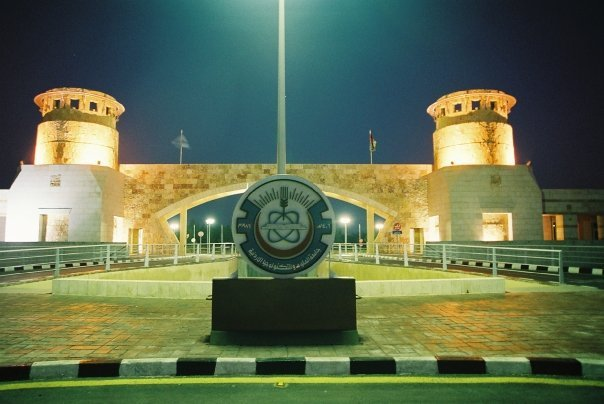
Main gate.

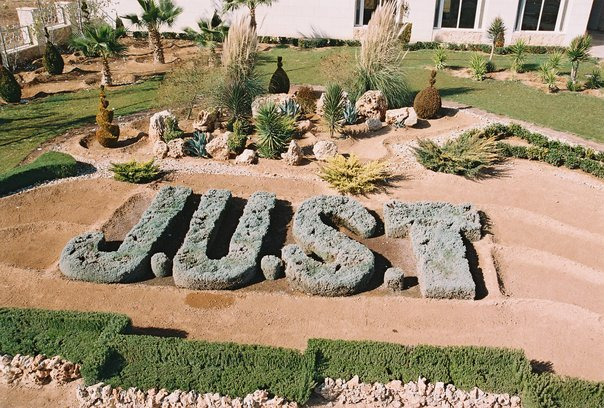
Clipped hedge at the Faculty of Architecture.

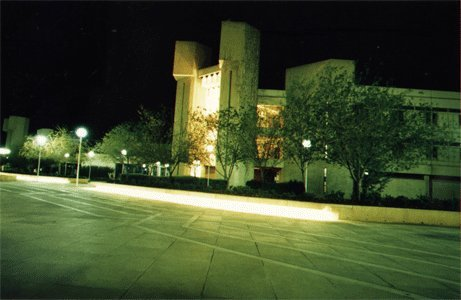
Night view of campus.

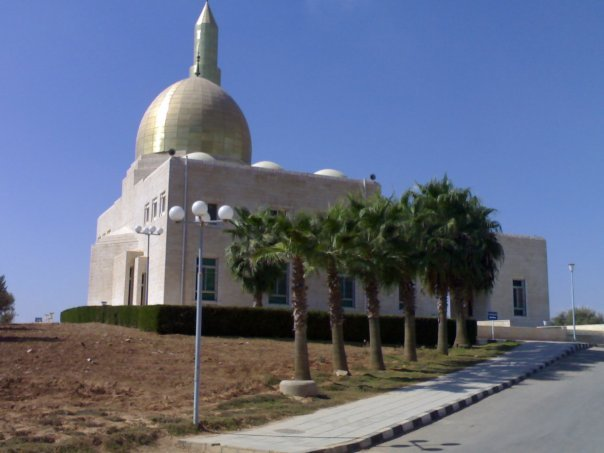
JUST mosque.

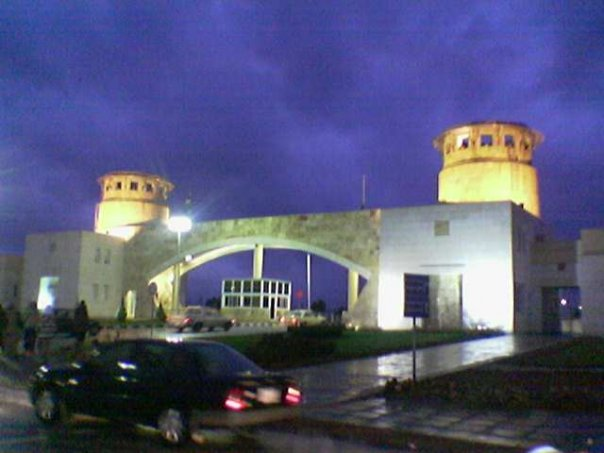
Main gate at night.

JUST 1986 logo.

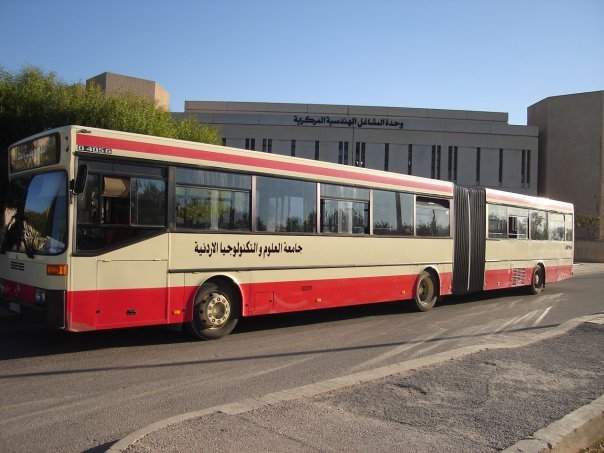
Transportation buses are used in the 11 km^{2} university campus.

== See also ==
- List of universities in Jordan
- List of Islamic educational institutions
