= Malhas Hospital =

Historic building in Amman, Jordan

Malhas Hospital مستشفى ملحس

Geography
- Location: Amman, Jordan
- Coordinates: 31°56′57″N 35°55′21″E

Organisation
- Type: Private hospital

History
- Opened: May 14th, 1945
- Closed: 2007

Malhas Hospital (Arabic: مستشفى ملحس) was the first Jordanian-owned private hospital in Jordan, founded by physician Qassem Malhas on May 14, 1945. Situated on Qassem Malhas Street next to the First Circle in the historic Jabal Amman neighborhood, the hospital played a pivotal role in providing healthcare services to the nation.

== Founder ==
Dr. Qassem Abdul Rahim Malhas (1904 - May 1985) was a pioneering Palestinian doctor, activist, and humanitarian. In addition to founding Malhas Hospital, Dr. Malhas also played a key role in establishing the Jordanian Medical Association in 1952, and served as the second president of the Jordanian Al-Faisaly Club (1935-1953).

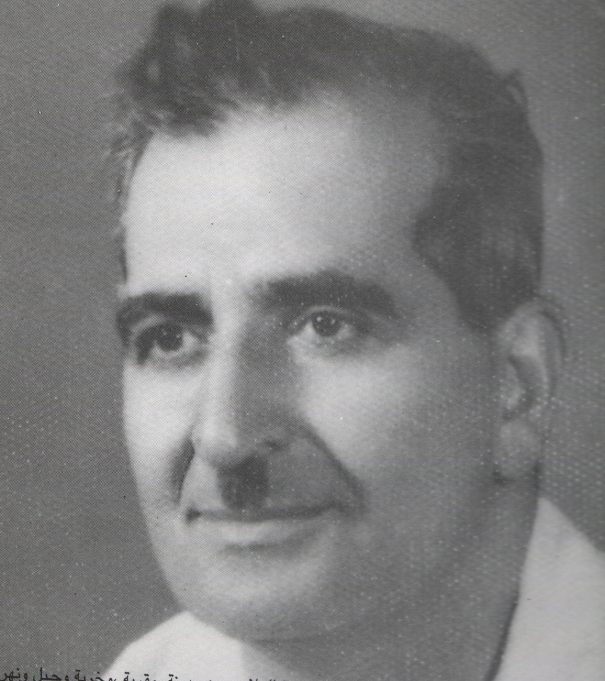
Dr. Qassem Malhas, founder of Malhas Hospital

== History ==
=== Establishment of Malhas Hospital ===
Malhas Hospital was established on May 14, 1945, by Dr. Qassem Malhas during a period when Jordan's medical infrastructure was still in its early stages. At that time, Amman had only seven hospitals: the Communicable Diseases Hospital, the Surgical Hospital, the Ainy Hospital, the Central Prison Hospital, the Italian Hospital, Dr. Qassem Malhas Hospital, and Dr. Boutros Abu Saba Hospital.

Recognizing the limitations of existing healthcare facilities, which lacked advanced medical equipment and did not adequately serve the general population, Dr. Malhas resolved to create a national institution that would benefit the Jordanian people and challenge the dominance of foreign-run healthcare services. This vision led to the establishment of Malhas Hospital, the first Jordanian-owned private hospital dedicated to local care. To ensure the hospital was well-equipped, Dr. Malhas took the initiative to acquire essential medical instruments, often transporting them from neighboring Palestine.

Opening with a capacity of thirty-five beds, Malhas Hospital became a significant milestone in Jordan's medical history. It marked Jordanian capability in healthcare and reflected the country's emerging independence, setting a precedent for the growth of private healthcare and playing a key role in the development of the medical sector.

=== Jordan's first radiation machine ===
Shortly after its establishment in 1945, the hospital acquired Jordan's first radiation machine (10-100 Kilovoltage), a critical tool for treating superficial tumors. Radiologists worked closely with radiology physicists and technologists to administer treatment, as Jordan had no radiation oncologists at the time. In a generous gesture in 1962, Dr. Malhas donated the machine to the Jordanian Ministry of Health.

=== Arab Wings Flight Ambulance Service ===
In October 1978, the Arab Wings Company launched its flight Ambulance Service, known as the Arab Wings Flight Ambulance Service (AWFAS), in collaboration with SOS International and Malhas Hospital in Amman. This subsidiary was jointly owned, with Arab Wings and Malhas Hospital each holding 30% ownership, while the remaining 40% was divided among other stakeholders in the medical sector in the Middle East. Through this partnership, Arab Wings and Malhas Hospital facilitated over 100 medical evacuation flights, each staffed by skilled doctors and nurses from Malhas Hospital in Amman.

== Redevelopment ==
Dr. Qassem Malhas funded Malhas Hospital for over 50 years since its establishment in 1945, without relying on external sources. However, as the hospital expanded, financial pressures necessitated seeking assistance from Jordanian banks, leading to significant loans. This ultimately resulted in the hospital's ownership being assumed by creditor banks, who put it up for sale in 2004.

After Dr. Qassem Malhas's passing in 1985, the hospital faced increasing debts, which led to a period of uncertainty. This period was marked by disagreements among Dr. Malhas's heirs, the Greater Amman Municipality (GAM), and other professional unions regarding the hospital's status.

=== Ownership transition ===
In 2004, three unions acquired the property at a public auction with plans to pursue commercial ventures such as a mall or a hotel. However, the hospital's original license strictly limited its use to healthcare services, making commercial redevelopment unfeasible. Due to these regulatory obstacles, the property was put up for sale again, and in 2011, it was purchased entirely by the Jordanian Bar Association.

=== Preservation efforts ===
The hospital was designated a heritage site by the municipality, recognizing its longstanding contribution to healthcare. This designation, along with uncertainty surrounding the original hospital license, created challenges for redevelopment, as it prohibited demolition or significant modifications. These restrictions led to calls for the building to be re-operated as a hospital, but the Jordanian Bar Association's ownership stalled any projects due to the heritage status deterring potential investors.

== See also ==
- List of Hospitals in Jordan
- Malhas Hospital on OpenStreetMap
