= King Abdullah University Hospital =

Coordinates: 32°30′6″N 35°59′39″E

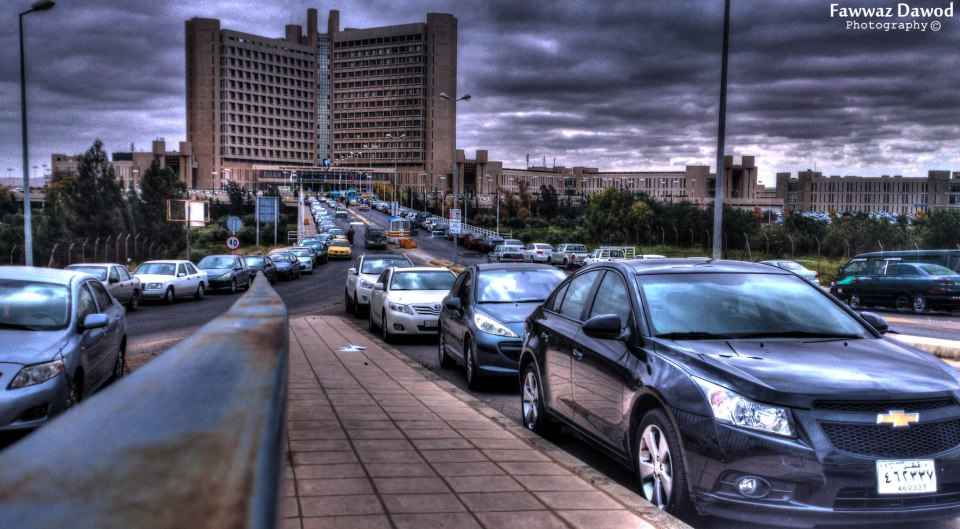
- KAUH as seen with the JUST Medical Faculties Complex at night

Geography
- Location: located within the JUST campus, Ramtha, Jordan

Organisation
- Funding: Non-profit hospital
- Type: Teaching
- Affiliated university: Jordan University of Science and Technology

Services
- Emergency department: Yes
- Beds: 750

History
- Opened: November 2002

Links
- Website: http://www.kauh.jo

King Abdullah University Hospital (Arabic: مُستشفى الملك المؤسس عبد الله الجامعي), often abbreviated KAUH, is a teaching hospital in Ar Ramtha, Jordan. It is the largest medical structure in the north of the country, serving approximately one million inhabitants from Ramtha, Irbid, Ajloun, Jerash, and Mafraq governorates. It is also the teaching hospital affiliated with Jordan University of Science and Technology (JUST), located within the campus adjacent to the university's Medical Faculties Complex. The hospital is staffed with full-time physicians and surgeons who are faculty members of the JUST Faculty of Medicine, in addition to many others from the Ministry of Health, and the Royal Medical Services (RMS).

The overall area of various hospital buildings is 95,583 m^{2}, in addition to a double story car park of 9,000 m^{2} area. The hospital has a bed capacity of 750 which can be increased to 900 beds in an emergency situation. Structurally, the hospital is composed of a 15-story high-rise building, in which all hospital beds are located, and a 3-story low-rise buildings in which patient clinics, diagnostic and other services are located. The hospital is connected to various health science faculties via the ground floor of the low-rise building.

During the COVID-19 pandemic, KAUH was designated by the Jordanian Ministry of Health as the main center for COVID-19 testing and isolation in the north of Jordan and one of 7 such centers in the country.

== History ==
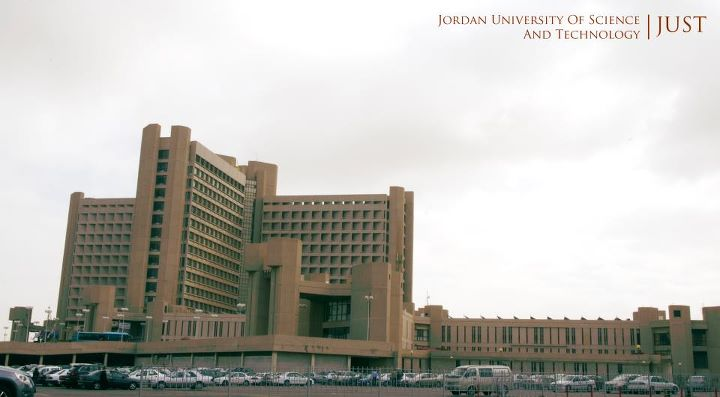
King Abdullah University Hospital

as seen with the JUST Medical Faculties Complex. Built by Acciona at a cost of approximately $120 million, the King Abdullah University Hospital was the culmination of efforts inaugurated by the late King Hussein bin Talal to address the critical lack of central, advanced medical facilities serving the population of Northern Jordan. Though King Hussein laid the cornerstone in a 1994 ceremony, he himself did not live to see the completion of the massive hospital, named after his grandfather, the founder of Transjordan, King Abdullah I. KAUH which was inaugurated by his Majesty King Abdullah II on 28 November 2002, has become, within short period of time, one of the most prominent and reputable non-profit hospitals in Jordan and the region. It opened with founding departments in obstetrics - gynecology, pediatrics, internal medicine, and general and special surgery, in addition to emergency facilities including a medevac heliport. JUST medical, dentistry, and nursing students complete laboratories, practicals, internship, and residency at or in close conjunction with KAUH and its extensive facilities.

== Departments ==
According to the KAUH official Web site, the hospital includes the following departments:

- General Surgery
- Special Surgery
- Emergency Department
- Pediatrics
- Obstetrics and Gynecology
- Internal Medicine and Dermatology
- Cardiac Center
- Diagnostic X-Ray
- Pathology and Laboratory
- Endoscopy Unit
- Ophthalmology
- Physical Therapy and Rehabilitation
- Physiology Function Test
- Neuroscience
- Nursing
- Information System Department

== Administration ==
Currently, Professor Sa'eb A. Khresat, president of Jordan University of Science and Technology is Chairman of Board of Directors of the hospital, and Prof. Mohammad Alghazo, Professor of urology, is the General Director.

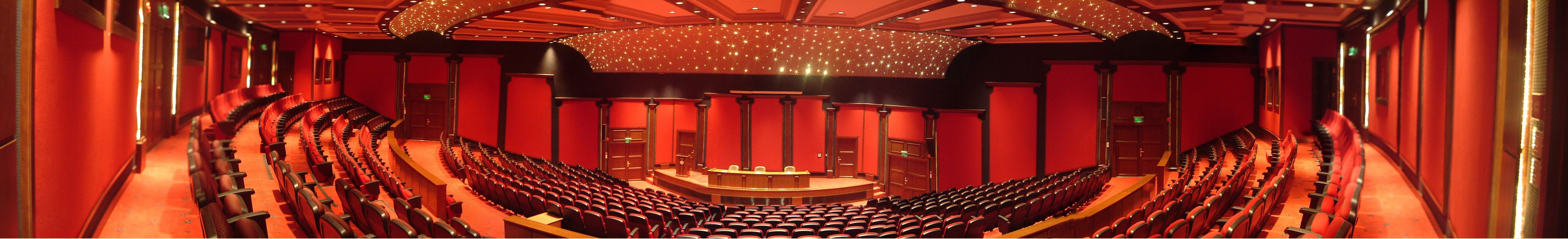
The Red Hall (conference room) in King Abdullah University Hospital, the teaching hospital of JUST. - Photo by Aymx

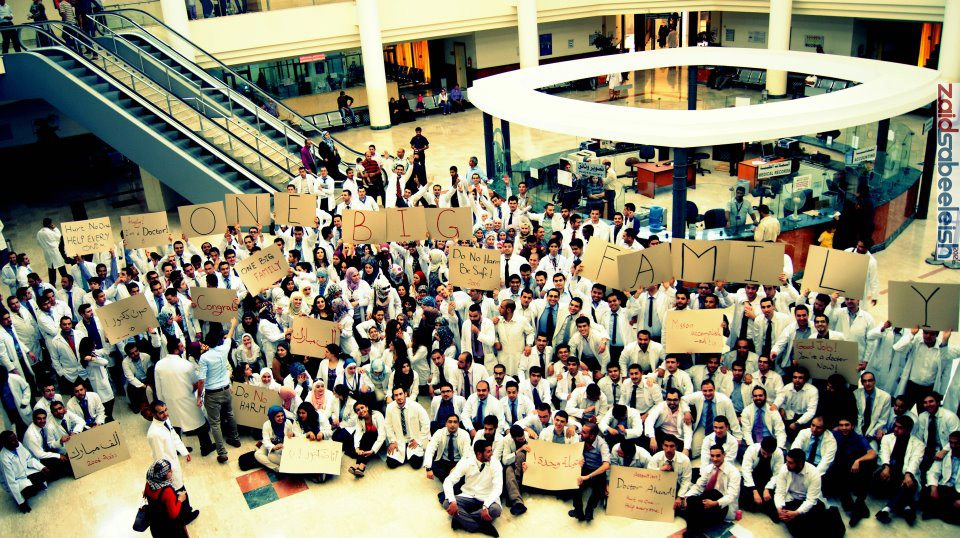
JUST School of Medicine Graduates at KAUH

== Picture gallery ==
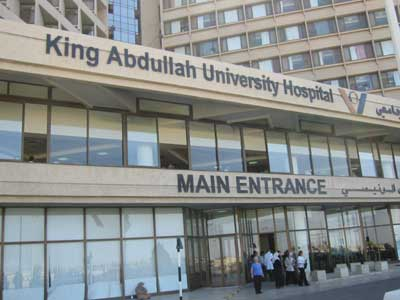
The Main Entrance to King Abdullah University Hospital.

King Abdullah University Hospital as seen from Al Ramtha.

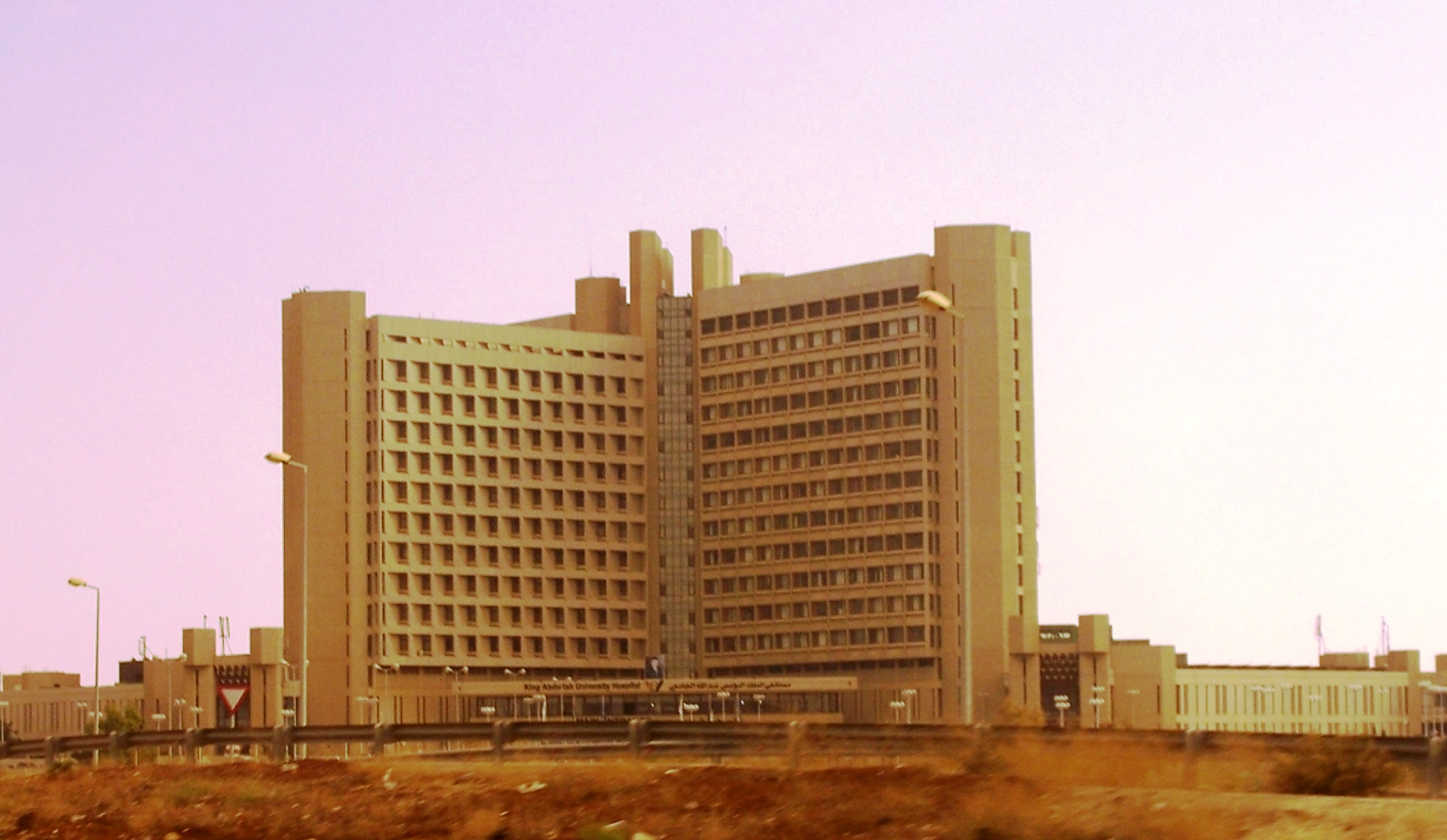
King Abdullah University Hospital in the morning.

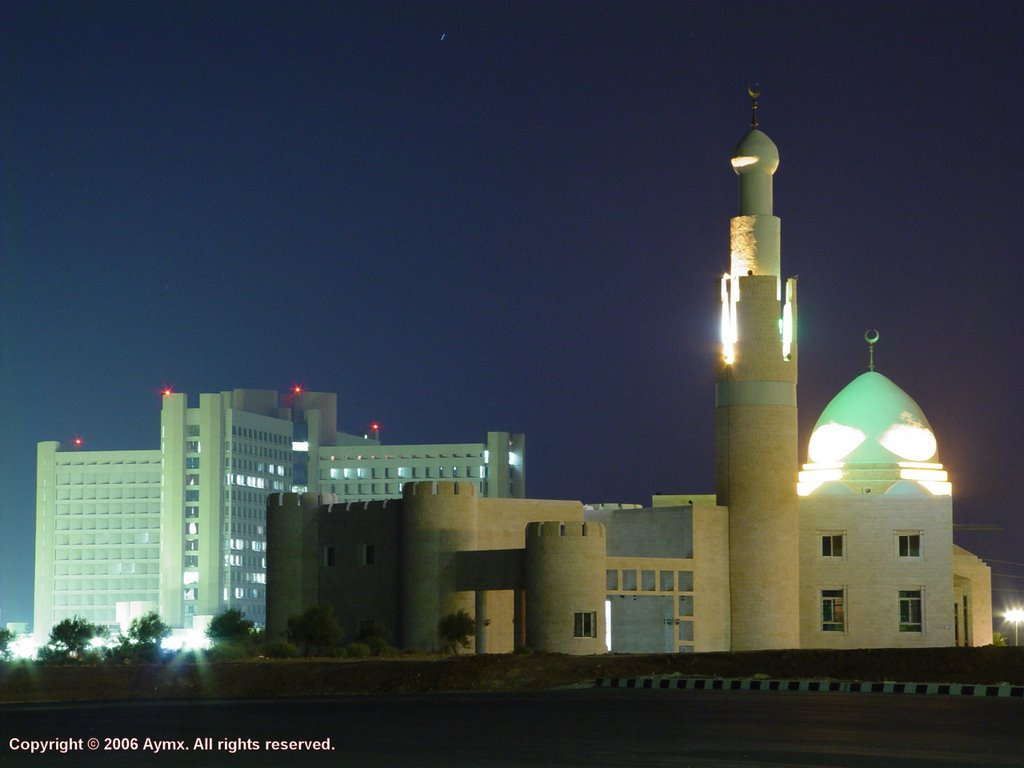
King Abdullah University Hospital which is the hospital of JUST and the mosque of the university at night - Photo by Aymx

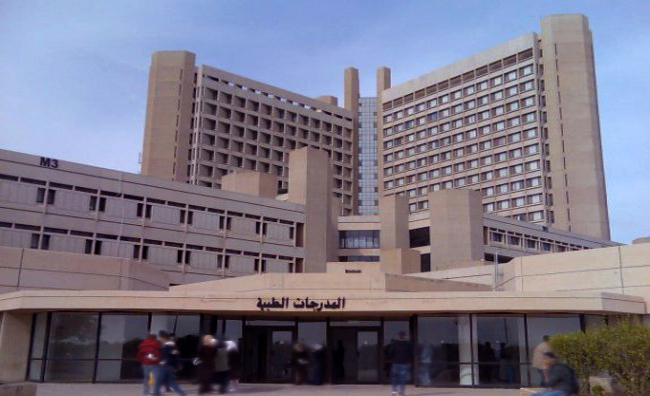
Medical halls of JUST as seen with King Abdullah University Hospital in the background.

A side view of King Abdullah University Hospital as seen from the JUST Medical Faculties Complex.

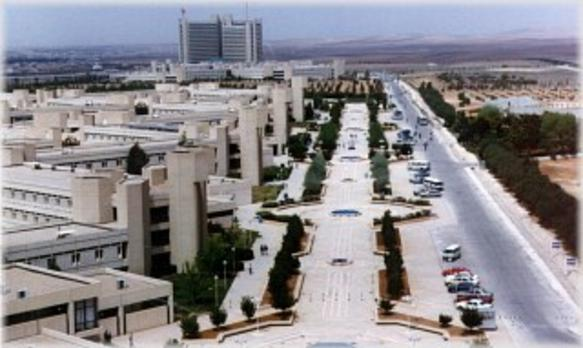
An Aerial View of The Medical Faculties Complex at JUST with KAUH seen in the background.

== See also ==
- Healthcare in Jordan
- Jordan University of Science and Technology (JUST)
- King Hussein Cancer Center
- King Hussein Medical Center
- Princess Haya Biotechnology Center (PHBC)
