= Modern American School =

Modern American School may refer to:

- Modern American School (Jordan)
- Modern American School (Mexico)
