= List of schools in Jordan =

Governorates of Jordan

This is a list of schools in the Asian country of Jordan (officially the Hashemite Kingdom of Jordan), sorted alphabetically by the Jordanian governorate to which each school belongs. This list includes primary schools and secondary schools; tertiary schools are included at the list of universities in Jordan.

== Governorates ==
Jordan is divided into twelve governorates (muhafazah) as follows:

(^{[P]} indicates a private school)

=== Ajloun Governorate ===
Schools in the Ajloun Governorate include:

- Ajloun Baptist School

=== Amman Governorate ===
Schools in the Amman Governorate include:

- Abdul Hamid Sharaf School; IGCSE; SAT; مدرسة عبد الحميد شرف
- Abul Bakkar School
- Ahliyyah & Mutran School; IB
- Ahmed Toqan School
- Al-Asriyah School; CIPP; المدارس العصرية
- Al-Redwan Schools; مدارس الرضوان
- Al Raed Al Arabi School
- Alliance Academy Jordan
- Amman Academy
- Amman Adventist Secondary School – Jabal Amman
- Amman Baptist School; IB; IGCSE; المدارس المعمدانية عمان
- American Community School in Amman
- Amman Baccalaureate School
- Amman National School
- Arab Model Schools; IGCSE; المدارس النموذجية العربية
- British International Academy; IB; الاكادمية البريطانية الدولية للبنات
- Bunat Aghad Academy
- Cambridge High School; IB
- De La Salle Frere
- Finnish Systems School; EST; AP; IGCSE; مدارس النظم الفنلندية
- International Academy Amman; IB; الاكادمية الدولية
- International Independent Schools (المدارس المستقلة الدولية); SAT; ACT; AP; administers PSAT/NMSQT and AP examinations
- International Leaders Academy; أكاديمية القادة الدولية
- International School of Choueifat
- Islamic Educational College; IGCSE; SAT; مدارس الكلية العلمية الاسلامية
- Jordanian International Schools for Girls; IGCSE; المدارس الاردنية الدولية للبنات
- Lycée Français d'Amman (The French School of Amman)
- Mashrek International School; IB; مدارس المشرق الدولية
- Mayar International Schools; مدارس ميار الدولية
- Modern American School
- Modern European Schools
- Modern Montessori School
- Modern Systems School; مدارس النظم الحديثة
- National Orthodox School; IGCSE; المدرسة الوطنية الأرثوذكسية
- Patriarch Diodoros The 1st School
- Philadelphia National School; IGCSE; SAT; مدارس فيلادلفيا الوطنية
- Prince Hamza Bin Al Hussien School
- Rawdat Al-Ma'aref School; IGCSE; روضة المعارف
- Remas International Academy; مدرسة أكاديمية ريماس الدولية
- Retaal International Academy; IGCSE; SAT; مدارس أكاديمية ريتال الدولية
- Repton New English School
- Rosary College School Amman
- Rosary Sisters School
- Sa'adeh College School
- Sands National Academy; IGCSE; SAT; اكادمية ساندس الوطنية
- Scientific Reyada School ( مدرسة الرياة العلمية )
- Terrasanta College; كلية تراسانطة
- Universal Civilizations Academy; IGCSE; SAT;

اكاديمية الحضارات الدولية

=== Aqaba Governorate ===
Schools in the Aqaba Governorate include:

- Al Qimma Schools – Amman ^{[P]}
- Aqaba International School ^{[P]}
- Ittihad Schools Aqaba
- Madrasit Al Maaref (مدرسة المعارف)
- Salt Academy School

=== Balqa Governorate ===
Schools in the Balqa Governorate include:

- Balqa Islamic School

=== Irbid Governorate ===
Schools in the Irbi Governorate include:

- Summit International Academy
- King Abdullah school for excellence ^{[P]}
- Adventist School
- Al-Arabiya Model School
- Al-Manara Schools ^{[P]}
- Al-Nahda Private School ^{[P]}
- Dar Al Uloum Schools ^{[P]}
- Greek Catholic School
- International Grand Academy
- Islamic School ^{[P]} (Al-Madares Al-Islamiya)
- Irbid International Schools
- Irbid Model School ^{[P]}
- Jeel Al Jadeed School
- Jordan National Schools ^{[P]}
- Khawla Bint Alazwar ^{[P]}
- Shoa'a Alammel School ^{[P]}
- Yarmouk University Model School Shafiq Irsheidat Secondary School for Boys Saad bin Abi Waqqas Secondary School for Boys Zabada Farkouh Primary Boys’ First School^{[P]}

=== Madaba Governorate ===
Schools in the Madaba Governorate include:

- Khadija Bent Khoweld School
- King's Academy ^{[P]}
- The Latin Patriarchate Schools ^{[P]}

=== Tafilah Governorate ===
Schools in the Tafilah Governorate include:

- Tafilah International Community School

=== Zarqa Governorate ===
Schools in the Zarqa Governorate include:

- American Continental Schools
- Zarqa Baptist Schools
- Zarqa Modern Schools

== See also ==
- Education in Jordan
- Lists of schools
