= Irbid =

City in Irbid Governorate, Jordan

Irbid إربد
- city
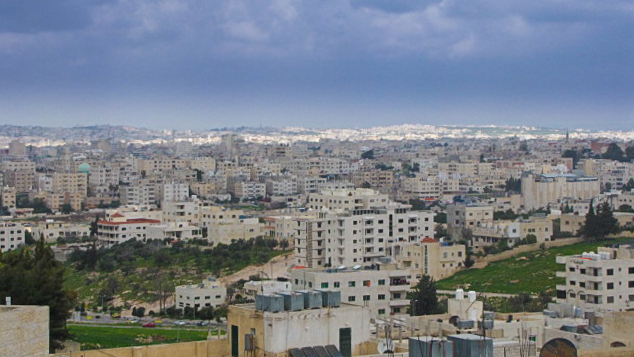
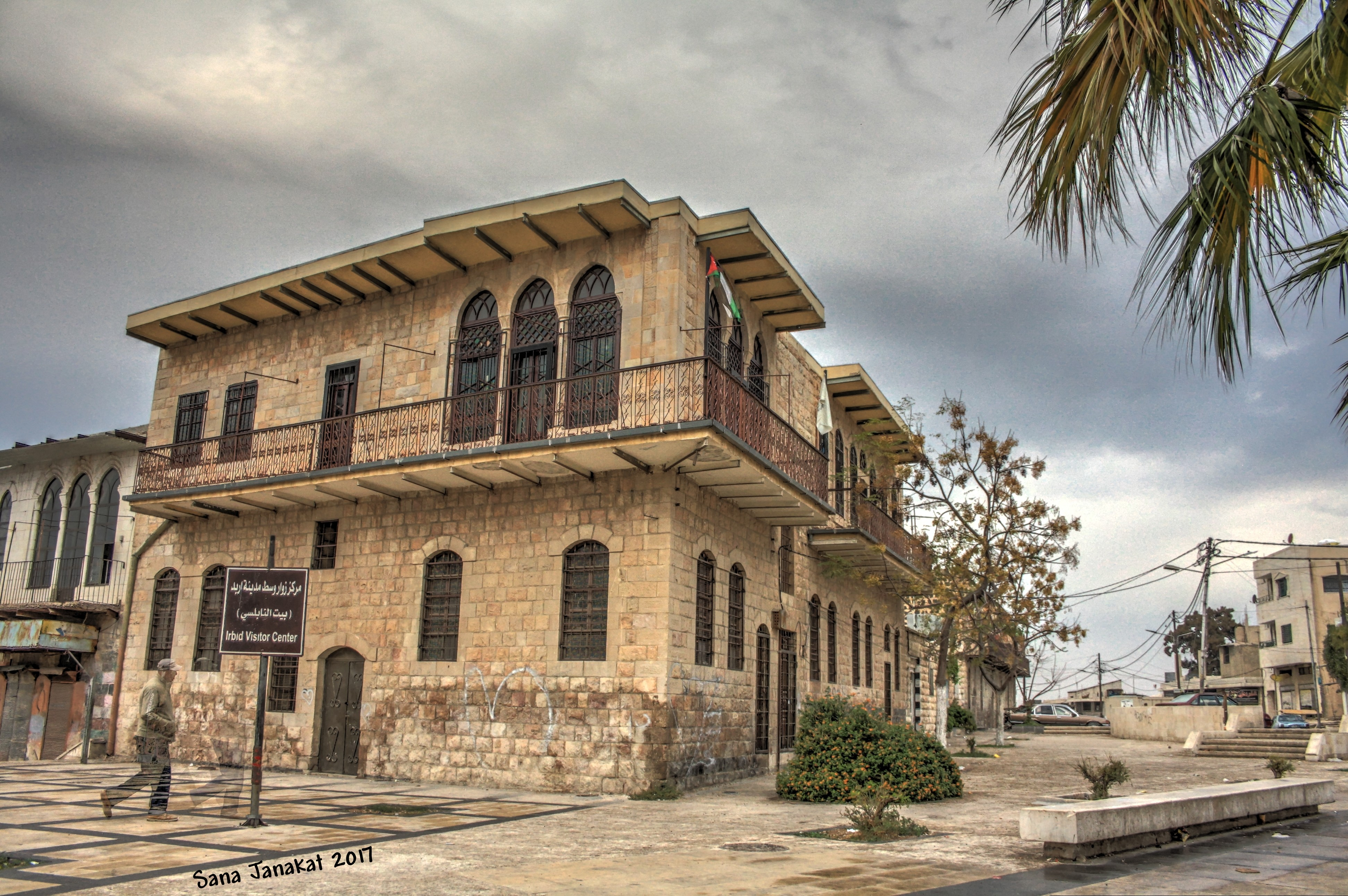
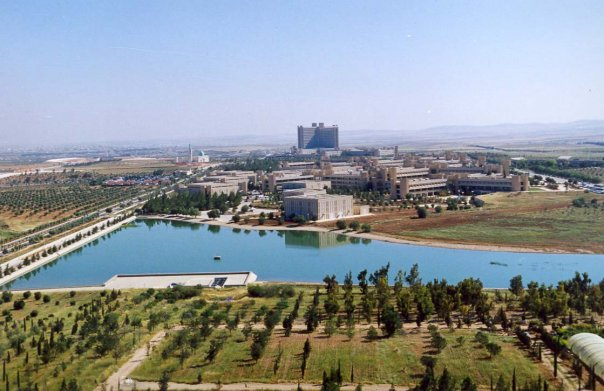
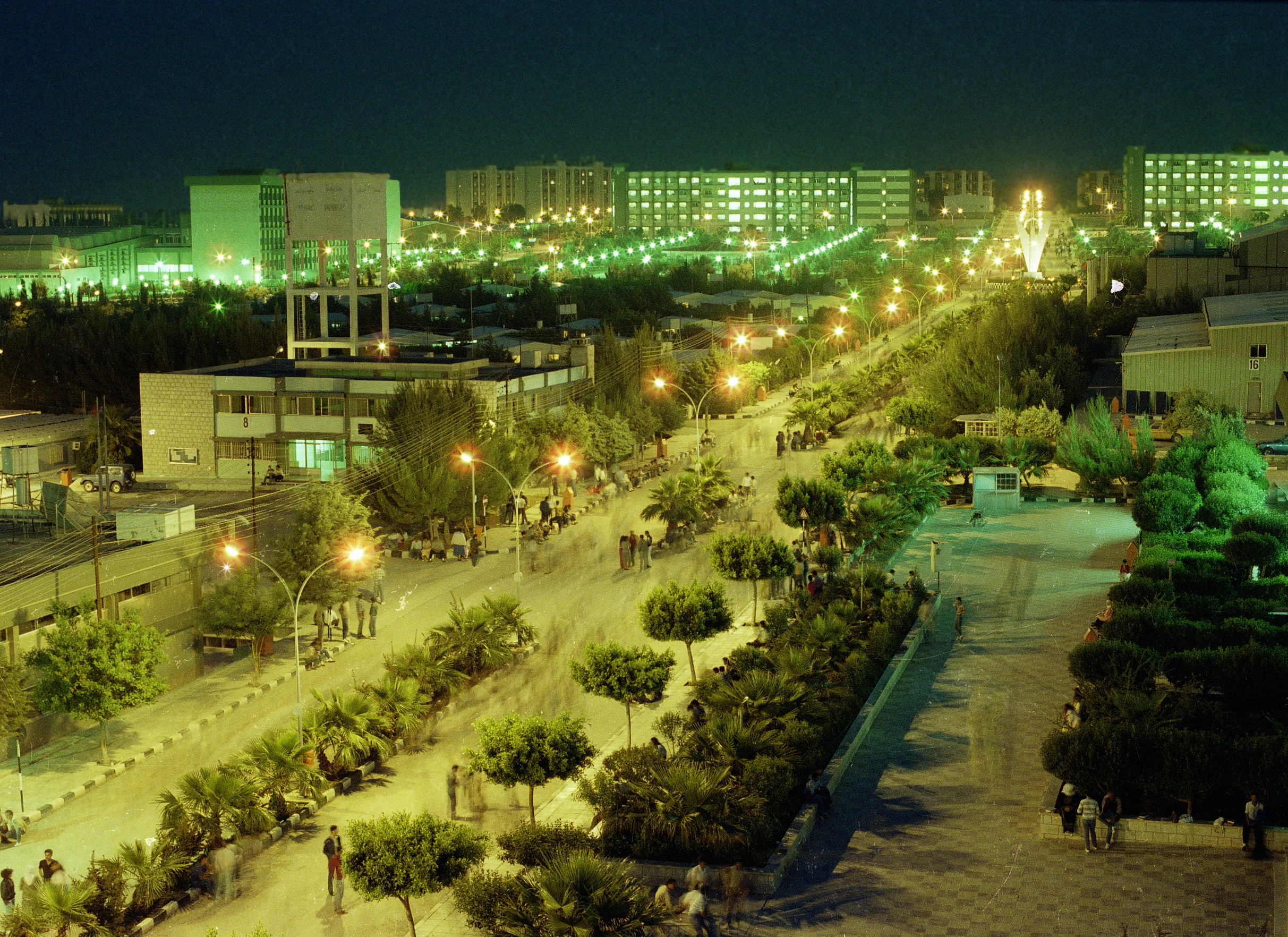
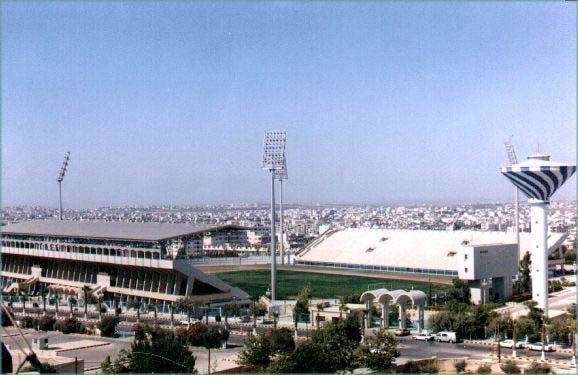
- Irbid Skyline Irbid Downtown JUST Yarmouk University Al-Hassan Stadium

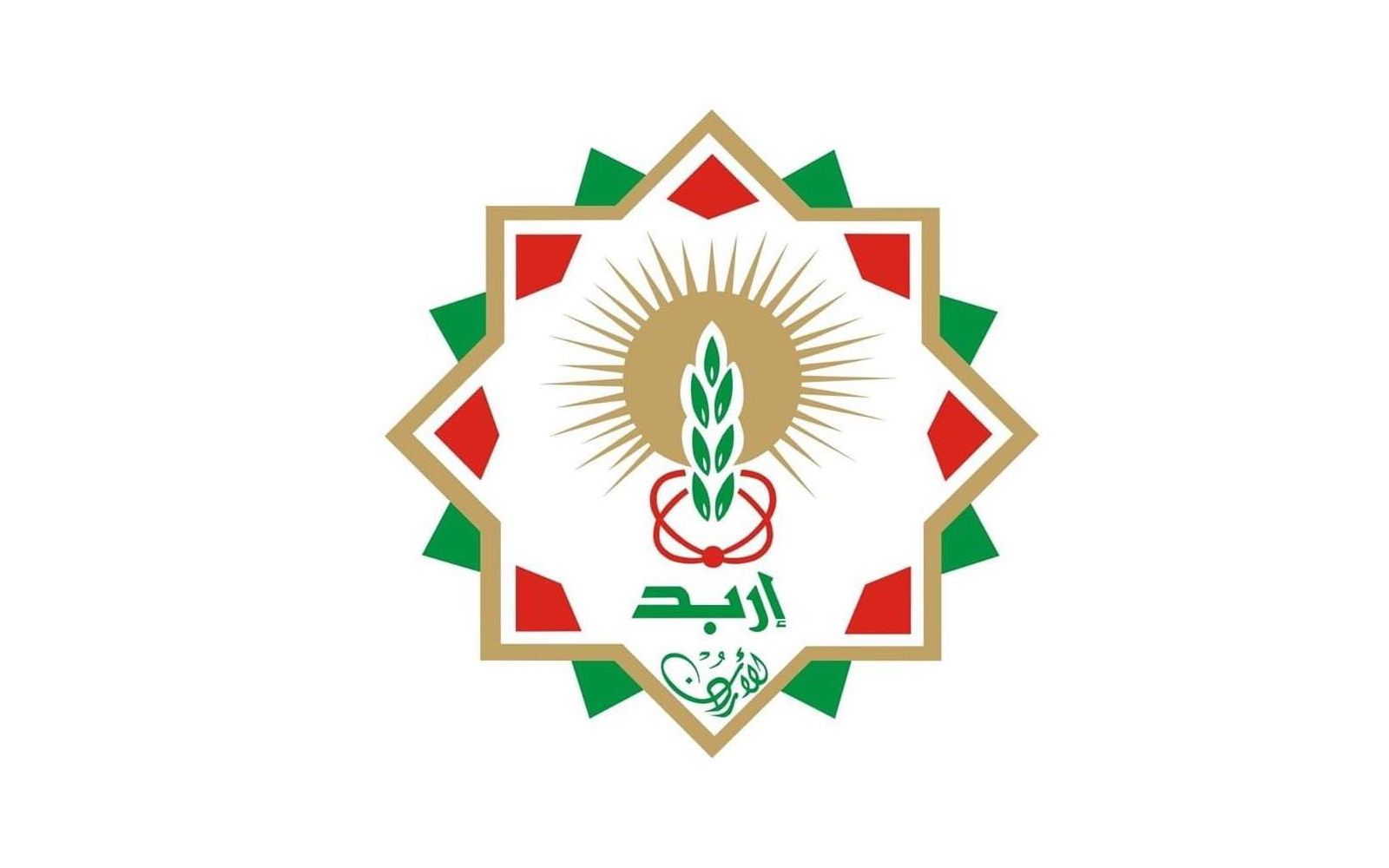
- Flag
- Nickname: Bride of the North
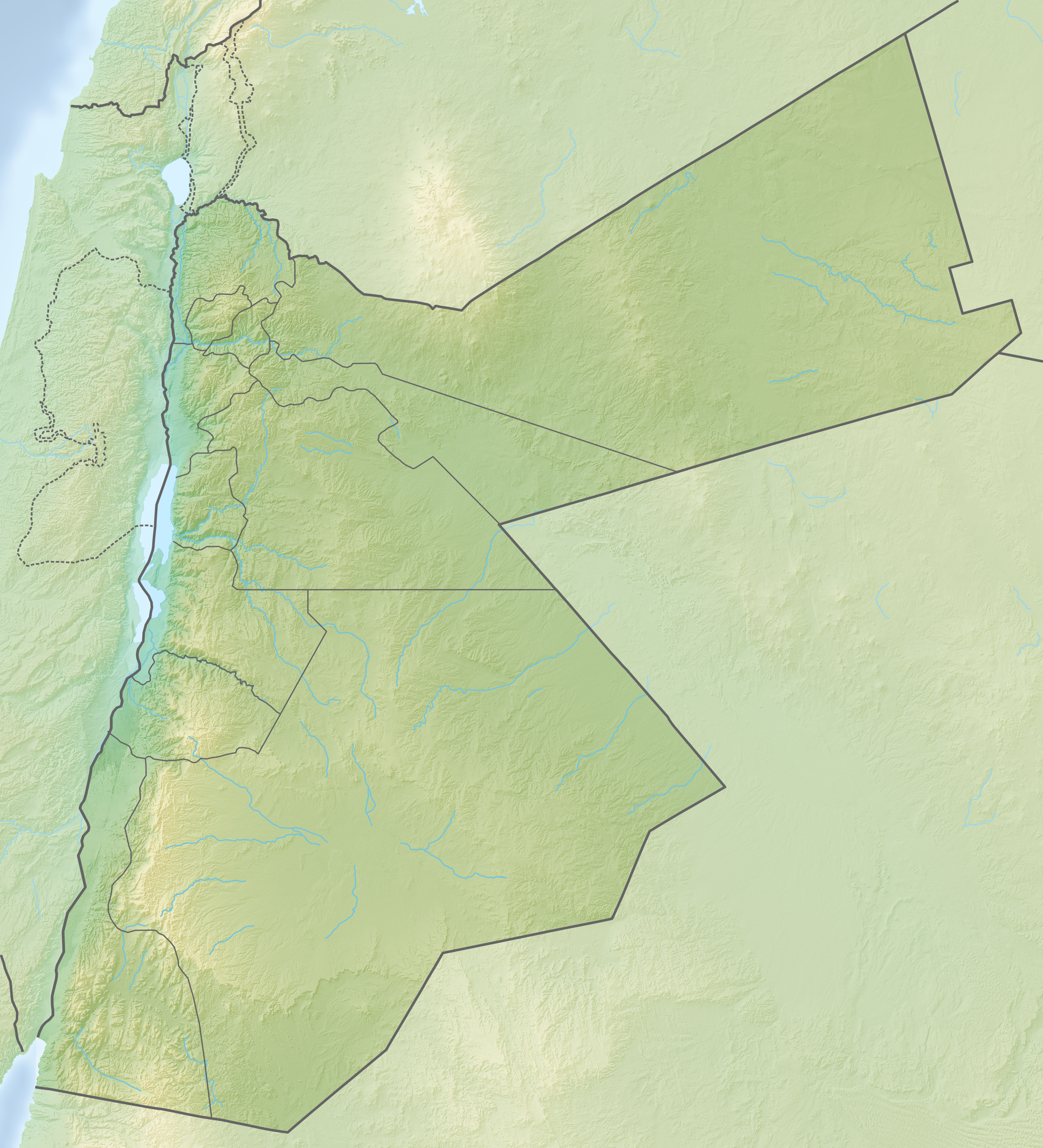
- Location within Jordan Location within Asia
- Coordinates: 32°33′0″N 35°51′0″E
- Grid position: 230/217
- Country: Jordan
- Governorate: Irbid Governorate
- Founded: 7000 BC
- Municipality: 1881

Government
  - Type: Municipality
  - Mayor: Imad Al-Azzam

Area
  - city: 410 km^{2} (160 sq mi)
  - Metro: 1,572 km^{2} (607 sq mi)
- Elevation: 620 m (2,030 ft)

Population (2025)
  - city: 569,068
  - Density: 1,400/km^{2} (3,600/sq mi)
  - Metro: 2,003,800
- Time zone: UTC+2 (GMT)
  - Summer (DST): +3
- Area code: +(962)2
- Website: www.irbid.gov.jo

Irbid (Arabic: إِربِد) is a city located on the northern ridge of the Gilead mountains in northern Jordan in the Irbid Governorate. The city lies approximately 20 kilometres (12 mi) south of the Syrian border, and is the largest city of the Irbid Governorate and the third most populous city of Jordan.

Irbid was known in classical antiquity with its ancient Greek name of Arabella, close to the cities of Pella, Beit Ras, and Um Qais. Irbid was built on successive Early Bronze Age settlements and was possibly the biblical Beth Arbel and the Arbila of the Decapolis, a Hellenistic league of the 1st–2nd century BC. The population of Irbid swelled in the late 19th century, and prior to 1948 it served as a significant centre of transit trade. The greater Irbid Municipality was established in 1881 in the late Ottoman period, making it the oldest municipality in Jordan.

It has the second-largest metropolitan population in Jordan after the capital Amman which lies about 70 kilometres (43 mi) to its south, with a population of around 2,003,800. It also has the third largest urban population in Jordan after Amman and Zarqa. The Irbid Governorate has the second largest population, and the highest population density in the kingdom. The city is a major ground transportation hub between Amman, Syria to the north, and Mafraq to the east. The Irbid region is also home to several colleges and universities.

== Name ==
The place-name Ἄρβηλα for present-day Irbid is first documented on civic bronze coins of the Decapolis struck in the late first century BC and the early first century AD, with the same Greek form recorded in 1 Maccabees 9 2 and in Josephus, Antiquities 12 11 1. The variant ʾrbl appears in Nabataean Aramaic inscriptions and in Safaitic Old Arabic graffiti dating from roughly the first century BC to the third century AD, and Eusebius lists a village called Arbela across the Jordan near Pella in his fourth-century Onomasticon. Excavations on Tell Irbid show continuous occupation from at least the Early Bronze Age around 3200 BC, placing the settlement more than two millennia before these Hellenistic attestations and more than three millennia before the earliest archaeological evidence for a permanent Jewish community in the northern Transjordan, which appears with the third or fourth century AD synagogue at Gerasa.

== History ==
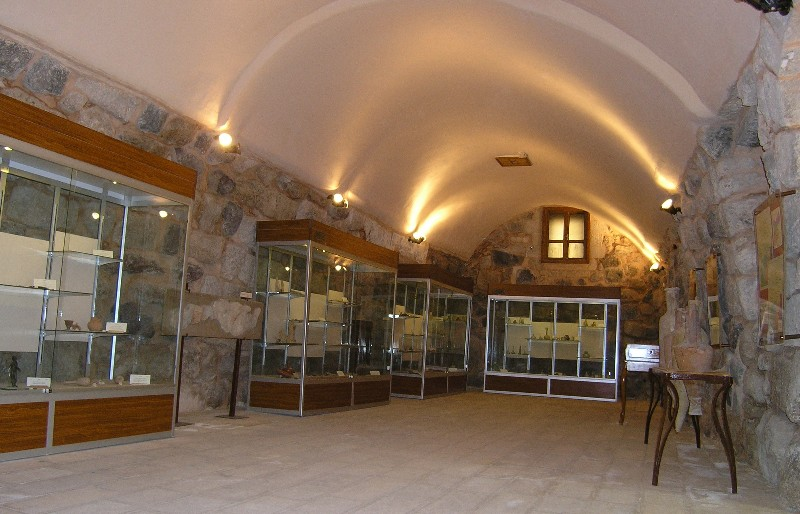
Pottery dating from the Bronze Age displayed in the Irbid Archaeological Museum

Artifacts and graves in the area show that Irbid was inhabited in the Bronze Age. Pieces of pottery and wall stones found at Tell Irbid were estimated to be made in the year 3200 B.C. A city wall dated to around 1300–1200 BC.

- Phase III (c. 3200 BC)
- Phase II (c. 1300–1150 BC)
- Phase I (c. 1150–800 BC)

In the Hellenistic period, Irbid—then known as Arabella—was a major trade center. Before the advent of Islam, Arabella was famous for producing some of the best wines in the ancient world. The area in the region had extremely fertile soil and moderate climate, allowing the growing of high quality grapes.

During the Early Muslim conquests, the city came under the rule of the Rashidun Caliphate in 634 and became known as Irbid, at which time it shifted from wine to olive oil production. Wheat was also an important product in the area.

In 1596 it appeared in the Ottoman tax registers named as Irbid, situated in the nahiya (subdistrict) of Bani Juhma, part of the Hauran Sanjak. It had 72 households and 35 bachelors; all Muslim. The villagers paid a fixed tax-rate of 25% on agricultural products; including wheat (22,500 akçe), barley, summer crops, fruit trees, goats and bee-hives; in addition to a market toll. The total tax was 38,116 akçe.

In 1838, Eli Smith noted Irbid (Arbela) as being a place with Sunni Muslim.

The Jordanian census of 1961 found 44,585 inhabitants in Irbid.

The city is home to four major universities: Yarmouk University, Jordan University of Science and Technology, Irbid National University and Jadara University. In addition, it has two campuses of Balqa Applied University and several private colleges.

Though not otherwise a major tourist destination, Irbid has two notable museums: the Museum of Jordanian Heritage and the Jordan Natural History Museum, both on the campus of Yarmouk University. Furthermore, Irbid's strategic location in northern Jordan makes it a convenient starting point for tourists interested in seeing the northern Jordan Valley; visiting Umm Qais, Beit Ras (Capitolias), Pella, Ajloun, Umm el-Jimal and other historical sites; or travelling on to Syria.

== Geography ==
Irbid is situated in northern Jordan, on a fertile plateau. As of 2010, the city of Irbid encompassed an area of 30 km^{2}, with residential areas making up 74.3% of the total area, followed by the Services areas occupying 9.5%, then Empty or unoccupied areas of 7.7%, then 4.2% is classified as Commercial areas, and 3.3% as Industrial areas, and finally gardens occupied 1% of the total city area.

=== Border cities ===
- Al-Kūrah
- Al-Mazār ash-Shamālī
- Al-Wasṭīyah
- Ar-Ramthā
- Aṭ-Ṭaībah
- Banī Kenānah
- Banī 'Obeīd

=== Climate ===
Irbid has a hot-summer Mediterranean climate (Köppen: Csa), common in the Levant region. Summers are hot at days with warm nights, while winters are cool and wet, with two snowy days on average.

Climate data for Irbid (1985–2018)
Month	Jan	Feb	Mar	Apr	May	Jun	Jul	Aug	Sep	Oct	Nov	Dec	Year
Mean daily maximum °C (°F)	13.3 (55.9)	14.7 (58.5)	18.1 (64.6)	23.1 (73.6)	27.4 (81.3)	30.2 (86.4)	31.8 (89.2)	32.0 (89.6)	30.3 (86.5)	27.1 (80.8)	21.0 (69.8)	15.7 (60.3)	23.7 (74.7)
Daily mean °C (°F)	9.4 (48.9)	10.0 (50.0)	12.9 (55.2)	17.9 (64.2)	21.1 (70.0)	24.0 (75.2)	25.8 (78.4)	26.2 (79.2)	24.6 (76.3)	21.3 (70.3)	15.6 (60.1)	11.1 (52.0)	18.3 (65.0)
Mean daily minimum °C (°F)	5.2 (41.4)	5.9 (42.6)	8.4 (47.1)	11.5 (52.7)	15.1 (59.2)	18.2 (64.8)	20.3 (68.5)	20.7 (69.3)	19.2 (66.6)	16.2 (61.2)	10.8 (51.4)	6.8 (44.2)	13.2 (55.8)
Average precipitation mm (inches)	100.3 (3.95)	99.8 (3.93)	63.6 (2.50)	19.9 (0.78)	5.8 (0.23)	1.6 (0.06)	0.0 (0.0)	0.0 (0.0)	0.7 (0.03)	12.4 (0.49)	42.6 (1.68)	83.2 (3.28)	429.9 (16.93)
Average precipitation days	11.3	10.6	9.4	4.6	2.0	0.2	0.0	0.0	0.2	3.2	6.0	9.6	57.1
Source: Jordan Meteorological Department

== Demographics ==
=== Demographic distribution ===
Historical population
Year	Pop.	±%
1884	1,300	—
1922	3,500	+169.2%
1952	23,157	+561.6%
1961	44,585	+92.5%
1970	73,000	+63.7%
1980	116,000	+58.9%
1994	208,329	+79.6%
2004	250,645	+20.3%
2015	502,714	+100.6%
2022	561,000	+11.6%

The city of Irbid is located in Irbid Governorate. It is the largest city in Jordan after Amman and Zarqa. It is considered the economic centre of northern Jordan. The greater Irbid municipality encompasses Irbid city with its surrounding areas (population about 2,050,300) making it the second largest metropolitan area in Jordan and the seventh in the Levant.

=== History ===
Irbid was one of the major towns of the territories of Jordan in the Ottoman era. One of the earliest censuses of Irbid was conducted by the Ottomans in 1596 where 72 households were recorded. The town gained importance after the creation of Transjordan region by the British after the first world war, as it was one of the major towns in that area.

Irbid's population increased significantly as part of Jordan's overall population growth, with notable peaks in 1948, 1967, and 2011 due to refugee crises in neighbouring countries.

== Districts of Greater Irbid Municipality ==
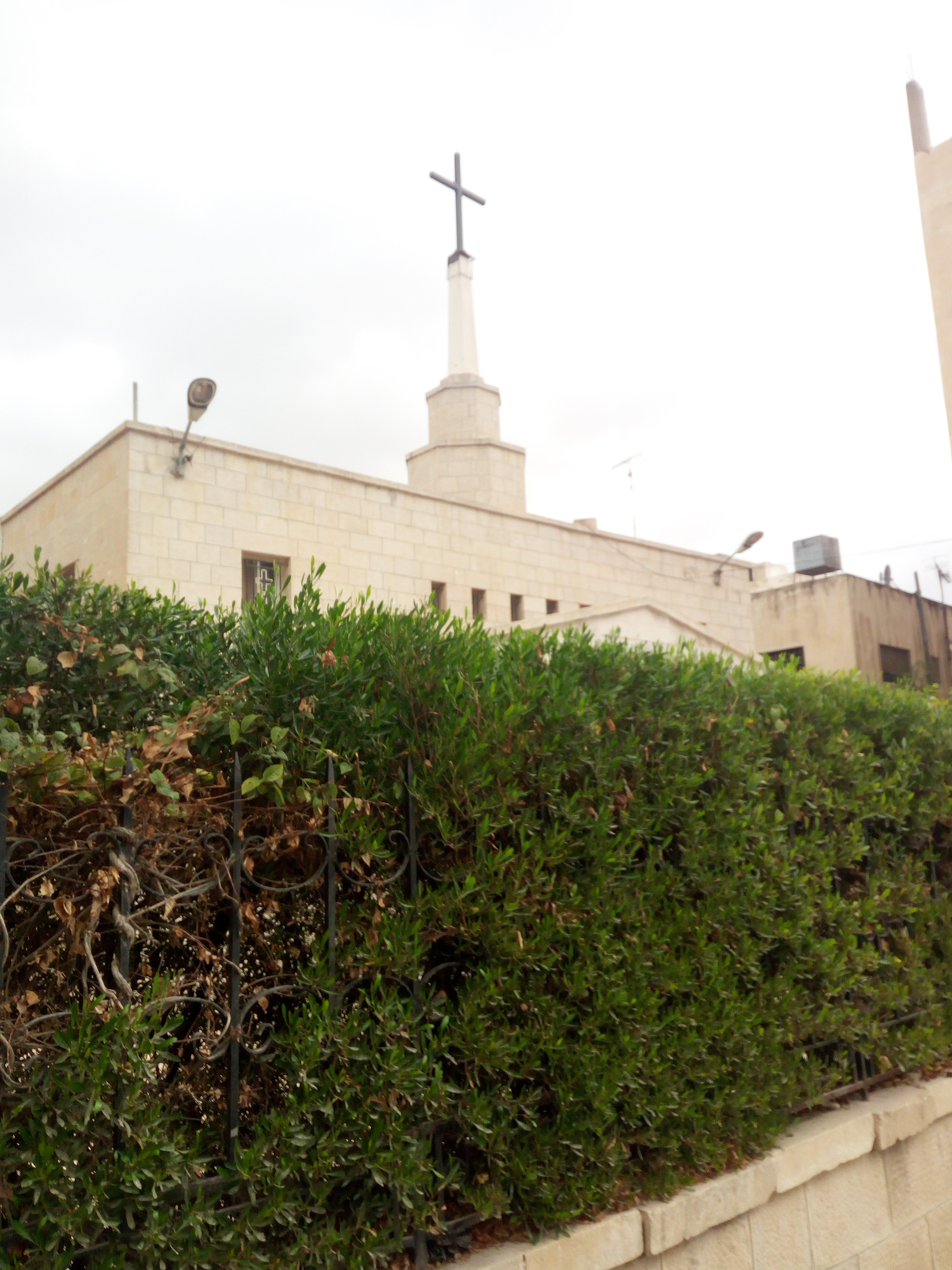
Church in Irbid

Irbid is divided into city districts forming smaller cities within the metropolitan sphere of influence of Irbid:

	District		District		District
1	Al'al (علعال)	9	Foa'ra (فوعرا)	17	Maru (مرو)
2	Al Husn (الحصن)	10	Hakama (حكما)	18	Al Mughayer (المغير)
3	Al-Rabia (الرابية)	11	Hashemiyah (الهاشمية)	19	Naser (نصر)
4	Al-Sareeh (الصريح)	12	Hawar (حور)	20	Rowdah (روضة)
5	Al Barha (البارحة)	13	Huwwarah (حوارة)	21	Sal (سال)
6	Beit Ras (بيت راس)	14	Kitim (كتم)	22	Nu'aimah (نعيمة)
7	Bushra (بشرى)	15	Kufr Jayez (كفر جايز)	23	Nuzha (نزهة)
8	Aydoun (ايدون)	16	Manarah-Hatim (منارة-حاتم)		

== Hospitals ==
Irbid is known for its excellent private hospitals. Some hospitals are members of the Private Hospitals Association (PHA), a non-profit organization that aims to raise the Jordanian health care reputation.

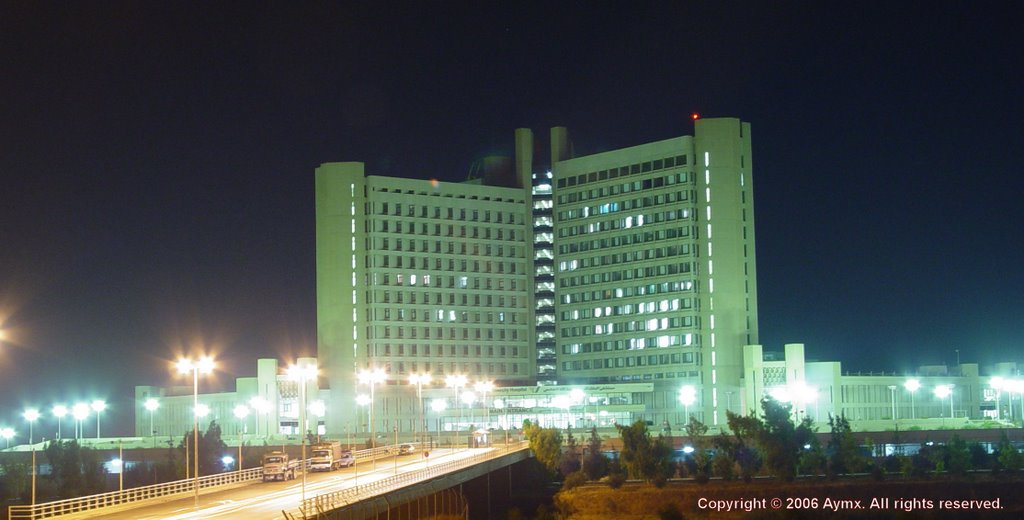
King Abdullah University Hospital in Irbid, the hospital of Jordan University of Science and Technology.

The largest hospitals in Irbid are:

- Abu Obaida Hospital
- Al-Najah Hospital
- Al-Qawasmi Hospital
- Al-Ramtha Hospital
- Al-Yarmouk Hospital
- Ibn Al-Nafees Hospital (Member of PHA)
- Irbid Islamic Hospital (Member of PHA)
- Irbid Speciality Hospital (Member of PHA)
- King Abdullah University Hospital
- Muath Bin Jabal Hospital
- Prince Rashid Bin Al Hassan Hospital
- Princess Badea'a Hospital
- Princess Basma Hospital
- Princess Rahma Hospital
- Princess Raya Hospital
- Rahbat Al-Wardieh Hospital
- Roman Catholic Hospital

== Education ==
As of 2007, there were 70,000 registered students in Irbid's 10 universities, community colleges and institutes, of whom 8,000 were international students from 47 countries. This high concentration of institutions of higher education has played a role in the identity of the city. The largest universities in Irbid are:

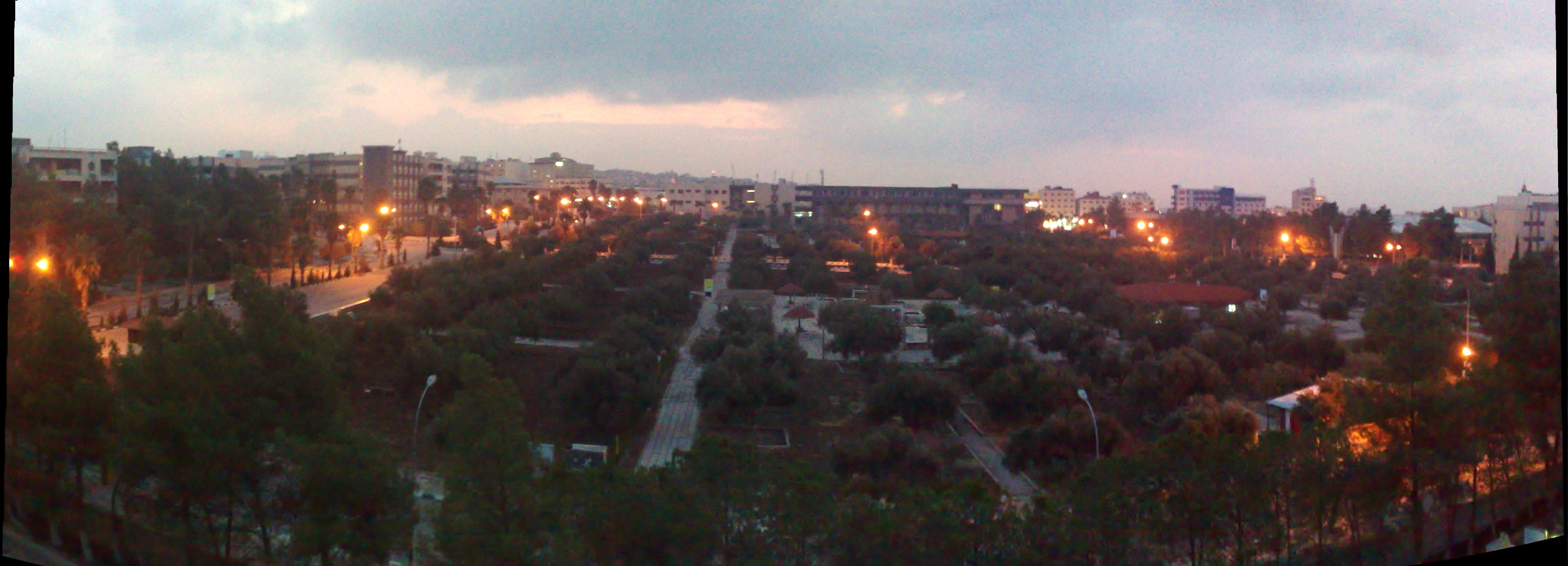
Yarmouk University

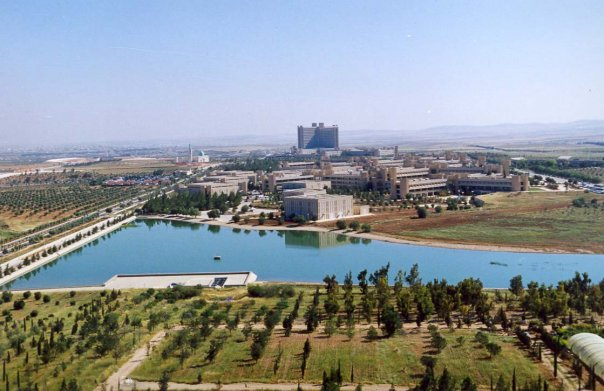
Jordan University of Science and Technology campus

- Yarmouk University
- Jordan University of Science and Technology
- Irbid National University
- Al-Balqa` Applied University (Irbid campus)
- Jadara University

Some of the private schools in Irbid (sorted by alphabetical order):

- Al-Jeel Al Jadeed School
- Al-Manara Schools
- Al-Nahda Private School
- American University School of the Middle East
- Arar Academy Schools
- Dar Al-Uloum Schools
- Greek Catholic School
- Irbid International Schools
- Irbid Model School
- Islamic School (Al-Madares Al-Islamiya)
- Jordan National Schools
- King Abdullah II School for Excellence
- Rosary Sisters School
- Summit International Academy National
- Yarmouk University Model School

== Economy ==
Irbid Mall in Western Irbid.

Most of the city's economy is based on the services sector, that is directly or indirectly related to the higher education institutions in the city, as an example there are 26 book publishing companies in the city. The number of internet cafes per capita is the highest in the world that took Irbid to the Guinness Book of World Records. Irbid is considered the cultural capital of Jordan. There is one Qualifying Industrial Zone in Irbid.

Irbid has several modern shopping centres that function as major retail and leisure hubs for the city and surrounding northern governorates. The largest is Irbid City Centre, a multi-story shopping complex developed by Marseilles Real Estate Investment Company and widely described as the biggest mall in northern Jordan. Another prominent destination is Arabella Mall, located in downtown Irbid, which combines retail outlets with dining and entertainment facilities.

== Sports ==
The Irbid-based club Al-Hussein (Irbid) was ranked fourth in the Jordanian football premier league in the year 2008. Its home matches are held in Prince Hasan Youth City's Stadium. The other major football club in Irbid is Al-Arabi. Established in 1945, it is one of the oldest athletic clubs in the country. As of 2008, there are 22 cultural and sport clubs registered in Irbid. Irbid hosted the 1999 Pan Arab Games.

== Twin towns – sister cities ==
Irbid is twinned with:

- Gaziantep, Turkey
- Zhengzhou, China

== General bibliography ==
- Government of Jordan, Department of Statistics (1964). First Census of Population and Housing. Volume I: Final Tables; General Characteristics of the Population (PDF).
- Hütteroth, W.-D.; Abdulfattah, K. (1977). Historical Geography of Palestine, Transjordan and Southern Syria in the Late 16th Century. Erlanger Geographische Arbeiten, Sonderband 5. Erlangen, Germany: Vorstand der Fränkischen Geographischen Gesellschaft. ISBN 3-920405-41-2.
- El-Khouri, Lamia, "Roman and Byzantine Settlements in the Region of West Irbid," Palestine Exploration Quarterly, 139,3 (2007), 166–185.
- Robinson, E.; Smith, E. (1841). Biblical Researches in Palestine, Mount Sinai and Arabia Petraea: A Journal of Travels in the year 1838. Vol. 3. Boston: Crocker & Brewster.
