= Nihaya Washahi =

Faction represented in the Knesset
- 2026–: Joint List

Personal details
- Born: Ar'ara, Israel
- Education: University of Haifa (BA); Jadara University (MA); Yarmouk University (PhD)

Nihaya Washahi is a Palestinian-Israeli politician who has served as a member of the Knesset for the Joint List since 2026.

== Biography ==
Washahi lives in Ar'ara and is an educator at Oranim Academic College, in addition to the Al-Qasemi Academic College of Education.

She received a bachelors degree in education from the University of Haifa, a master's degree in education administration from Jadara University and a doctorate in the same subject from Yarmouk University.

== Political career ==
Washahi was active in local politics in Rahat and served as the deputy mayor. She was placed in the ninth position on the Joint List's Knesset list and was elected to the Knesset following the 2026 Israeli legislative election as the alliance won eleven seats.
