= AHSS =

AHSS may refer to:

- Abdul Hamid Sharaf School, private school in Amman, Jordan
- Academic health science system, type of partnership between healthcare research and provider organisations
- Advanced High Strength Steel
- Almaguin Highlands Secondary School, a high school in Ontario, Canada
- Applewood Heights Secondary School, a high school in Mississauga, Ontario, Canada
- Architectural Heritage Society of Scotland
- Arts, humanities and social sciences, a grouping of academic disciplines
- Atiyah–Hirzebruch spectral sequence, computational tool from homological algebra
- American Heinrich Schütz Society, American branch of the International Heinrich Schütz Society (Internationale Heinrich-Schütz-Gesellschaft)
