= Ajloun Baptist School =

Location
- Ajloun; Jordan
- Coordinates: 32°19′31.53″N 35°45′4.4″E

Information
- Opened: 1952
- Principal: Haniya Oweis
- Website: https://www.ajlounbaptistschool.org

Ajloun Baptist School (Arabic: المدرسة المعمدانية - عجلون) is a Baptist private, co-educational school based in Jordan. Founded in 1952, the school is made up equally of Christian and Muslim Students. The school originally offered K-12 education but currently offers K-9. It can accommodate up to 452 students. It is the oldest of two Baptist schools located in Jordan.

== See also ==
- Education in Jordan
- History of Jordan
- List of schools in Jordan
