= Museum of Jordanian Heritage =

Museum at Yarmouk University, Jordan

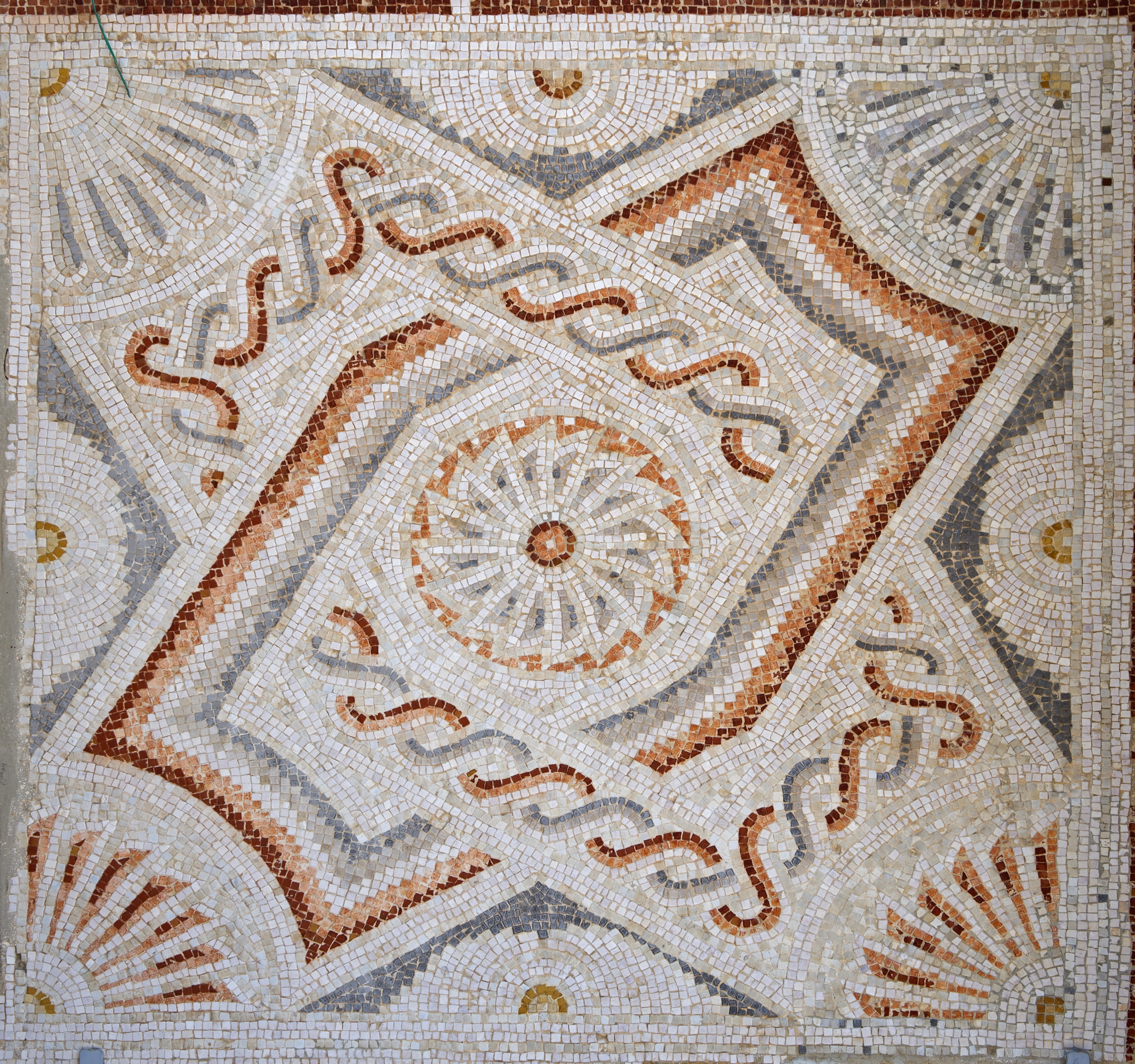
- Established: 1988; 38 years ago
- Location: Irbid, Jordan
- Coordinates: 32.535749°N 35.853812°E
- Type: Cultural museum
- Owner: Yarmouk University

The Museum of Jordanian Heritage (Arabic: متحف التراث الأردني) is part of the Faculty of Archeology and Anthropology at Yarmouk University. The museum also shows the stages of civilization development that Jordan witnessed during successive periods of time, focusing on cultural relations, contacts, population distribution, economic life, and various aspects of civilization.

== History ==
The museum was opened in 1988 with support from the German government. The Department of Antiquities of Jordan provided the museum with several artifacts, and Widad Qa'war gave the museum ethnographic costumes. In 2013, some antiquities were stolen from the museum.

== Collections ==
The museum consists of four rooms. The first is dedicated to prehistoric times, showcasing the development of early civilizations and plant collection systems. The third room is dedicated to artifacts from the Roman and Byzantine periods found in a cemetery near Queen Alia International Airport. The fourth room is dedicated to artifacts dating from the early Islamic period, the first caliphate, and settlements at the end of the nineteenth century. It also covers the Ayyubid, Mamluk and Ottoman periods. The museum has a hall dedicated to Coinage, among them coins made of gold, bronze and copper dating from the Lydian, Nabataean, Roman Byzantine, Hellenistic and Islamic periods. The museum contains silver coins that were used during the reign of Sharif Hussein bin Ali. It also contains a bronze medal with the face of Abdullah bin Al-Hussein. Among the museum's collections are tools of King Faisal I. The museum also contains ceramics, badges of recognition and plates. The museum contains statuettes found at ʿAin Ghazal.

== Gallery ==
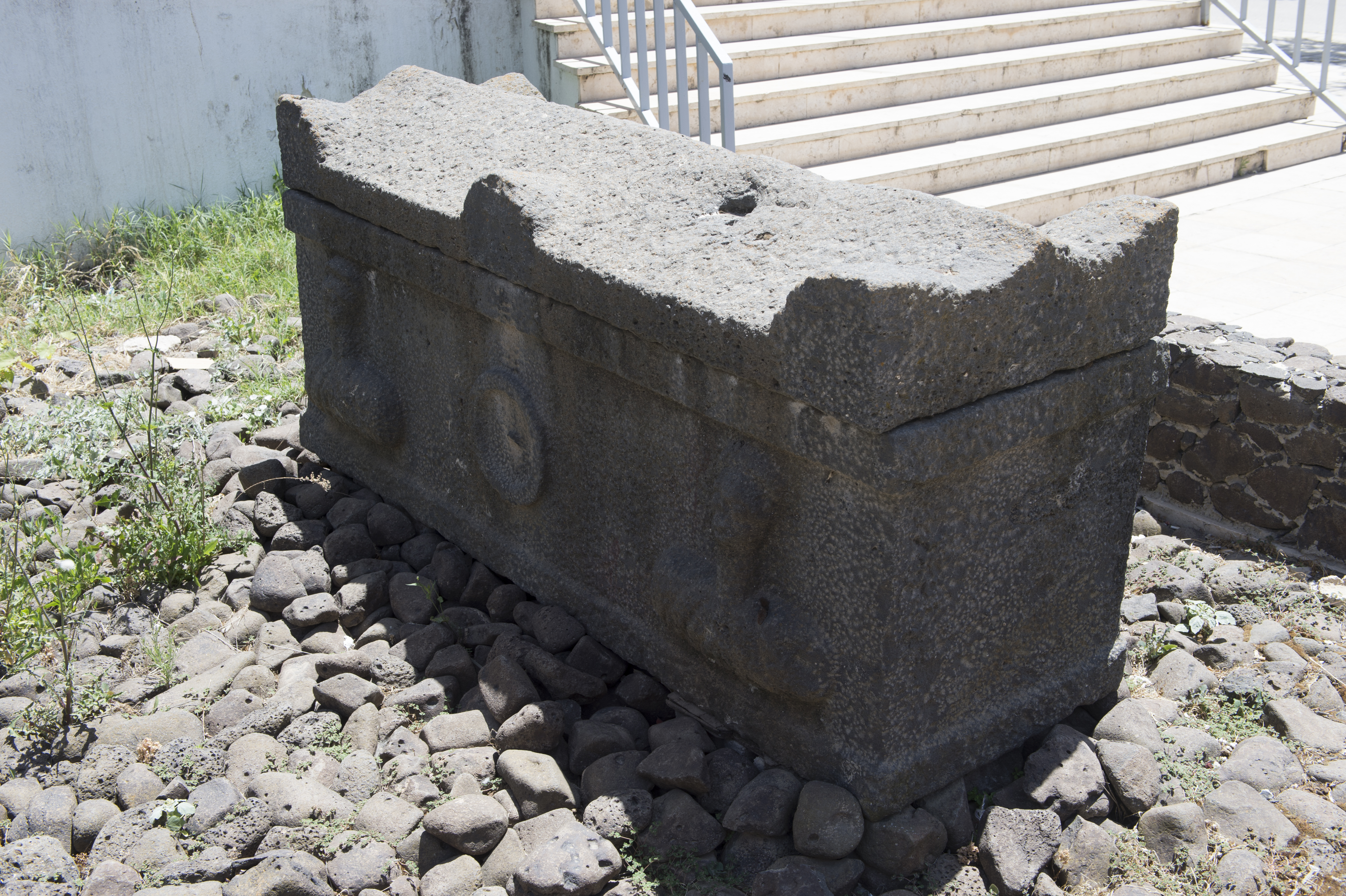
A simple sarcophagus, probably Roman

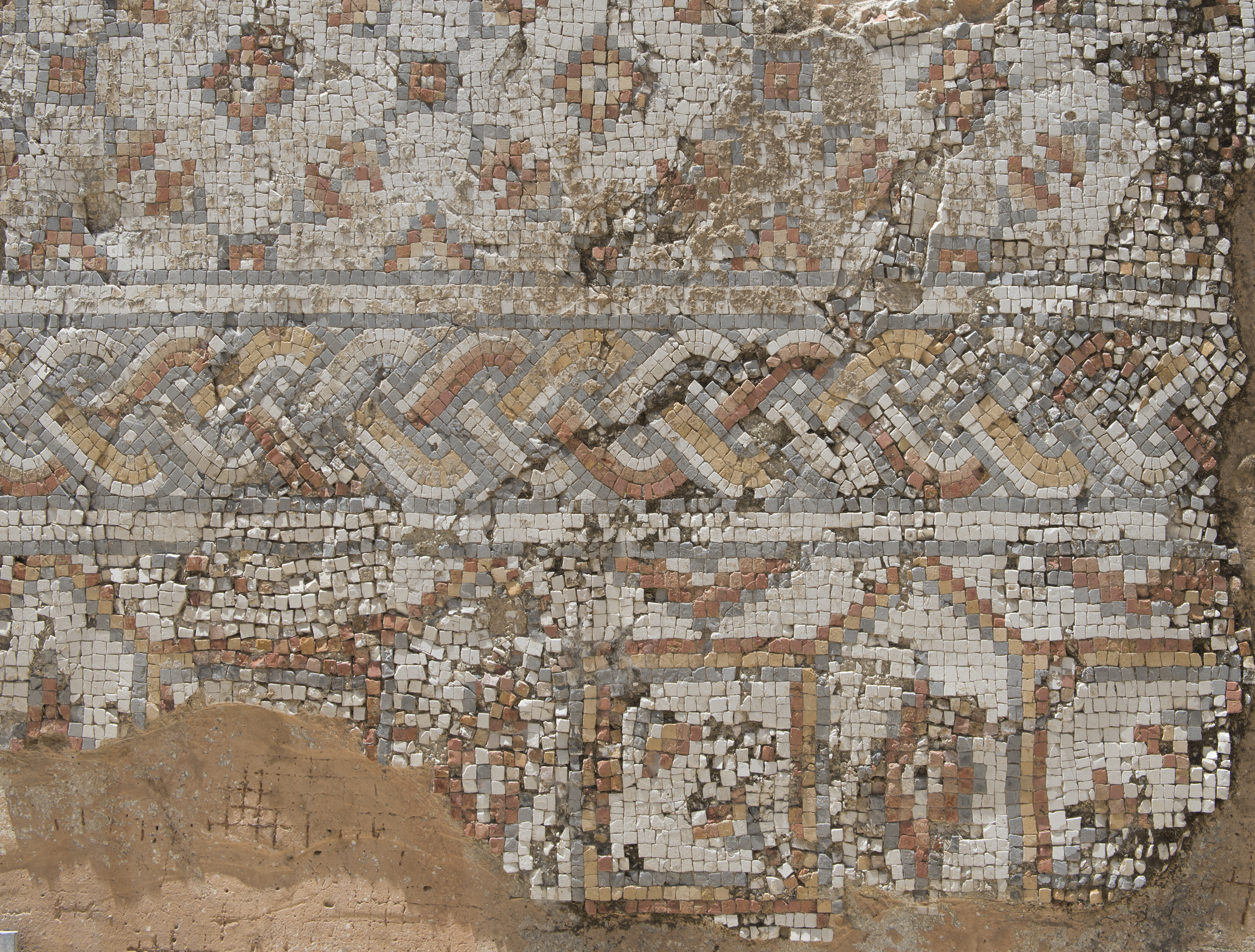
Irbid Museum Of Jordanian Heritage Mosaic

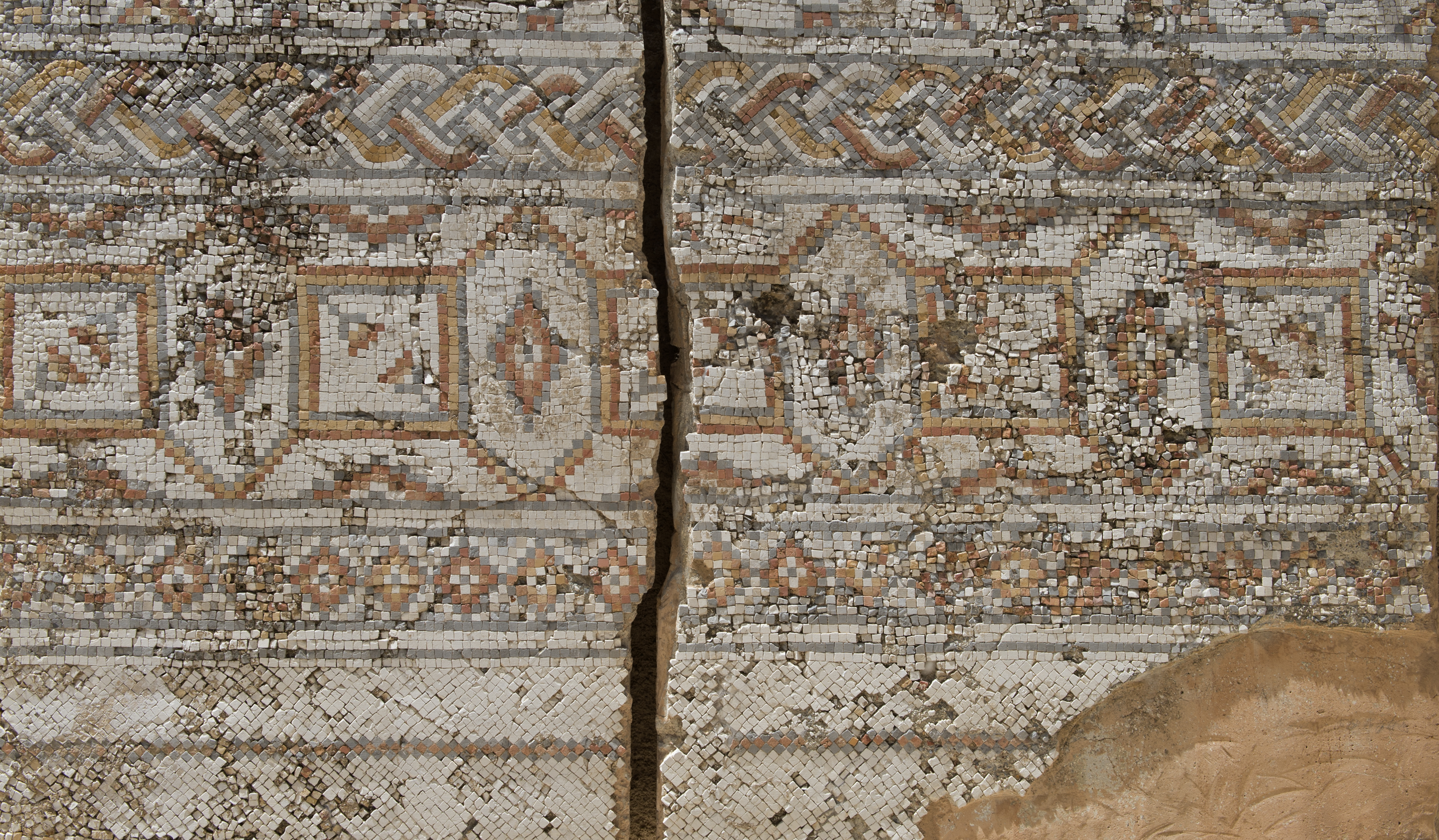
Irbid Museum Of Jordanian Heritage Mosaic

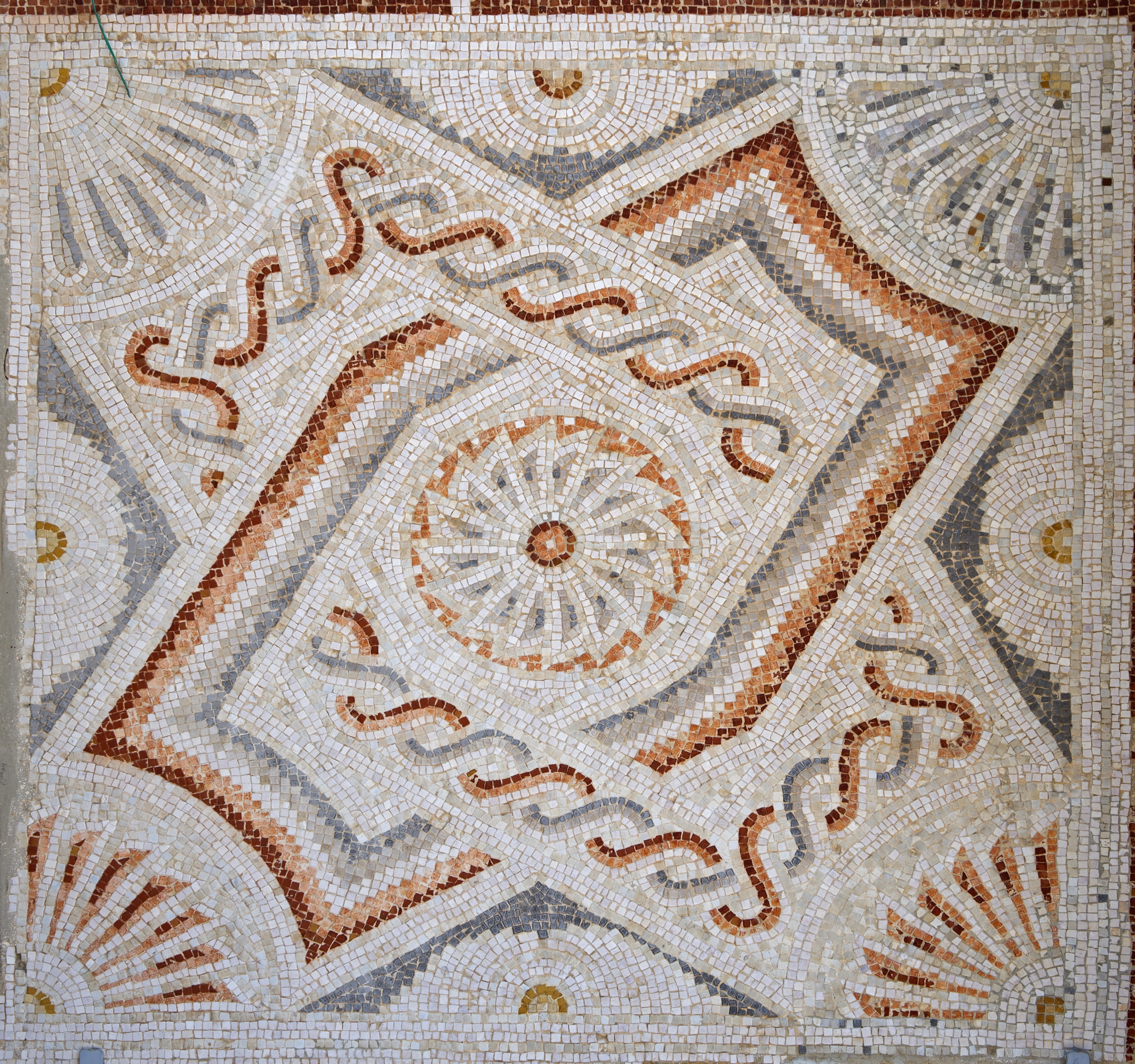
Irbid Museum Of Jordanian Heritage Mosaic They may have been late Roman.

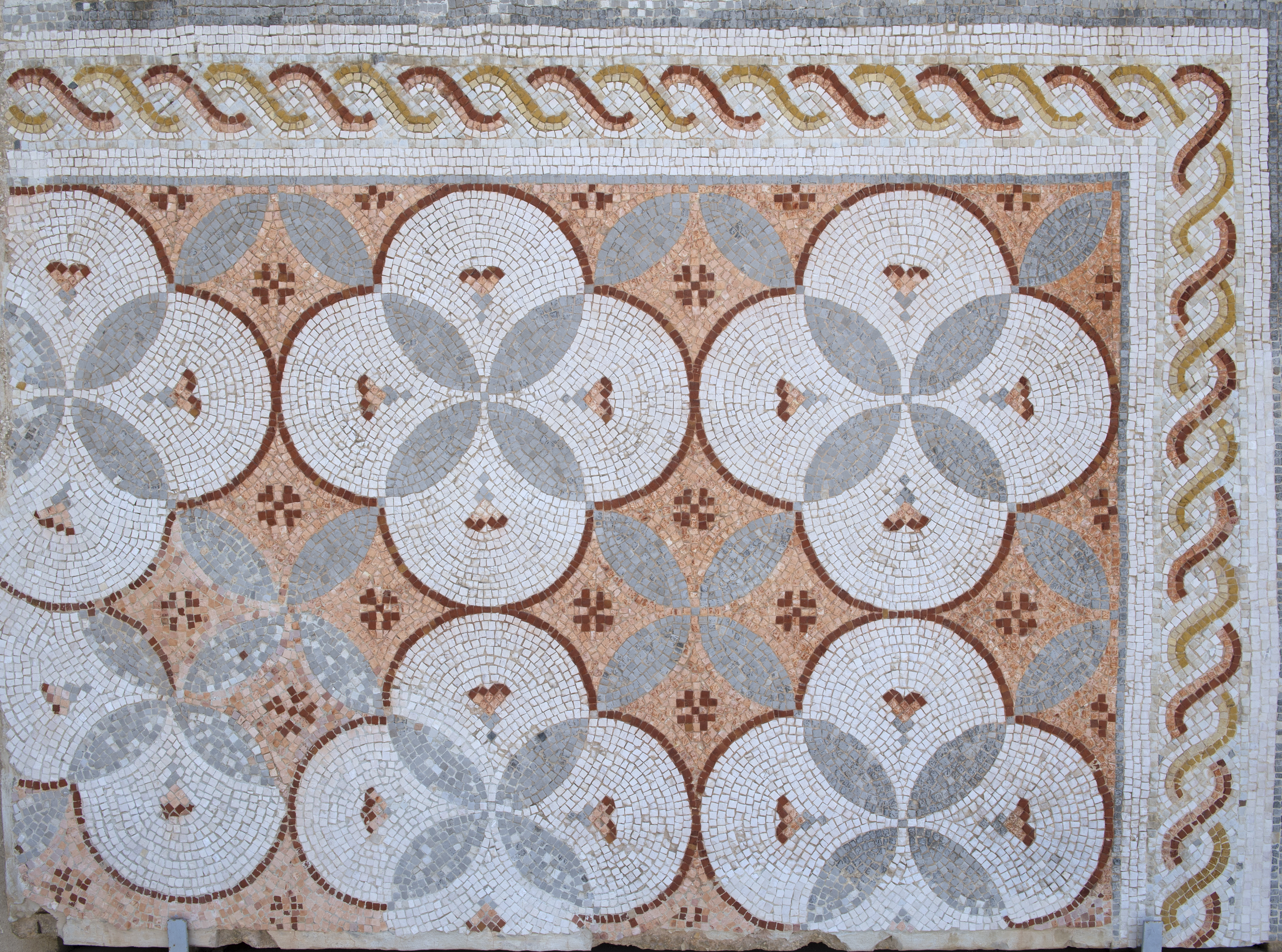
Irbid Museum Of Jordanian Heritage Mosaic

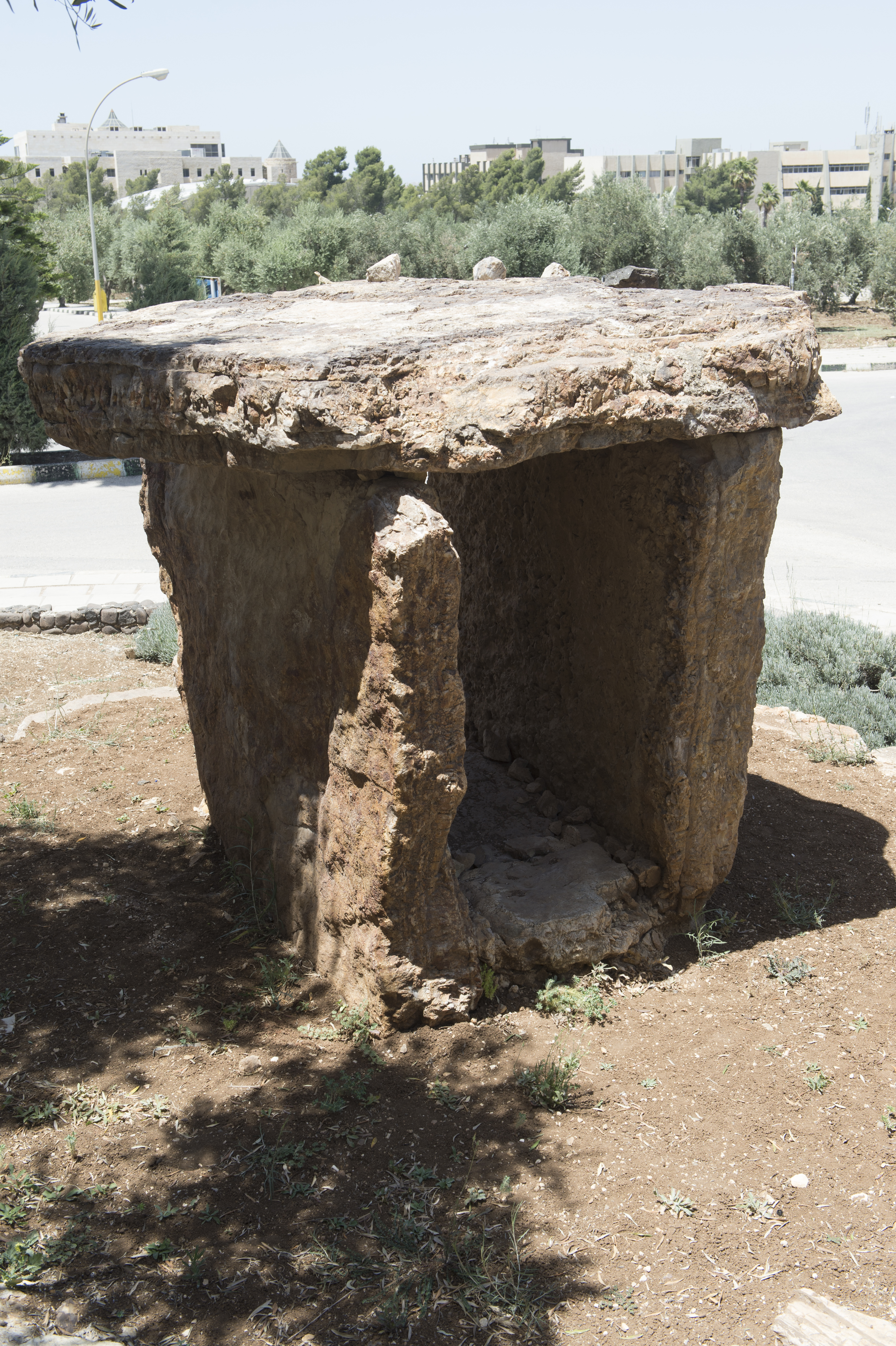
Irbid Museum Of Jordanian Heritage Dolmen

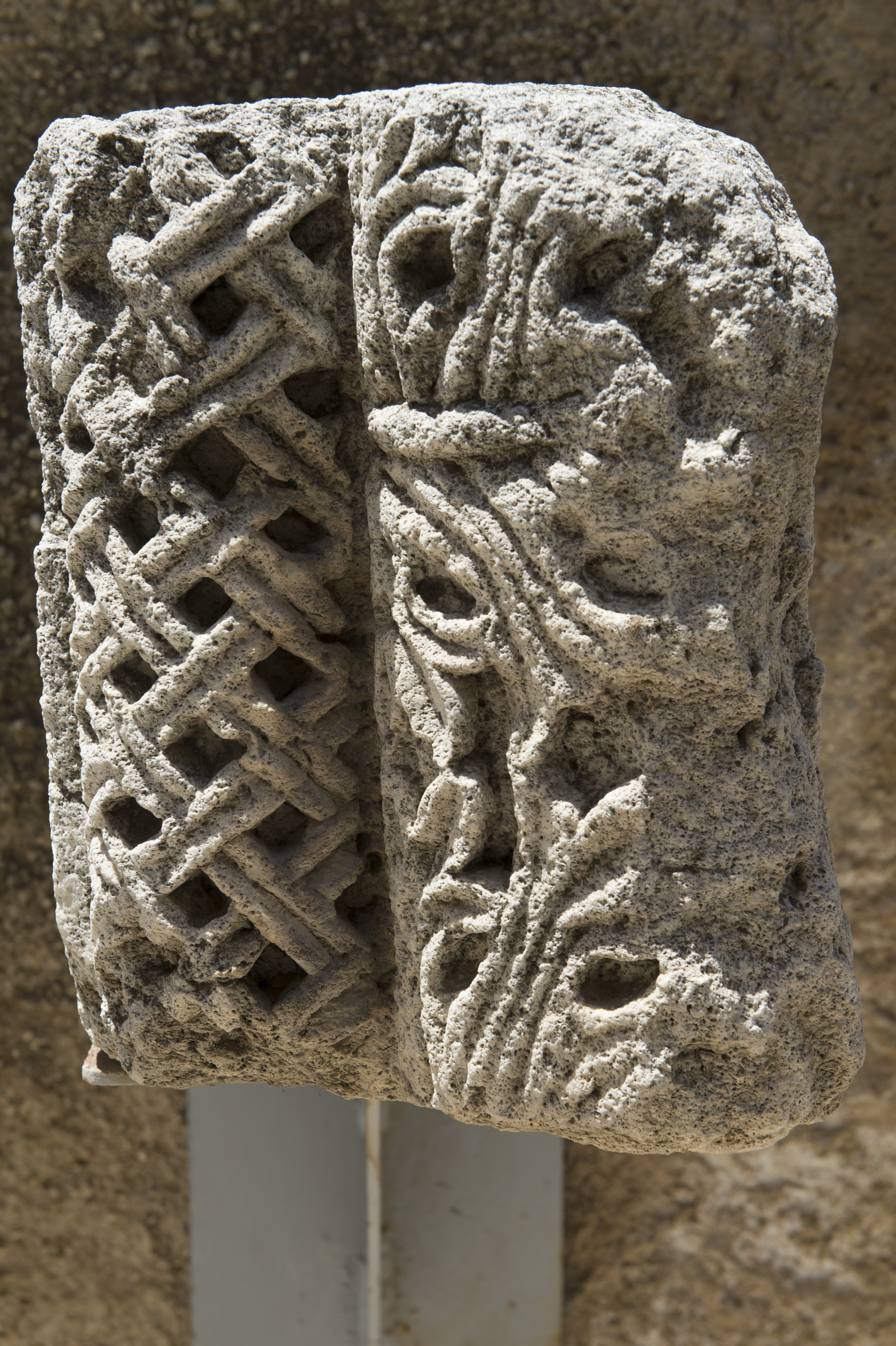
Decorated stone in Museum Of Jordanian Heritage

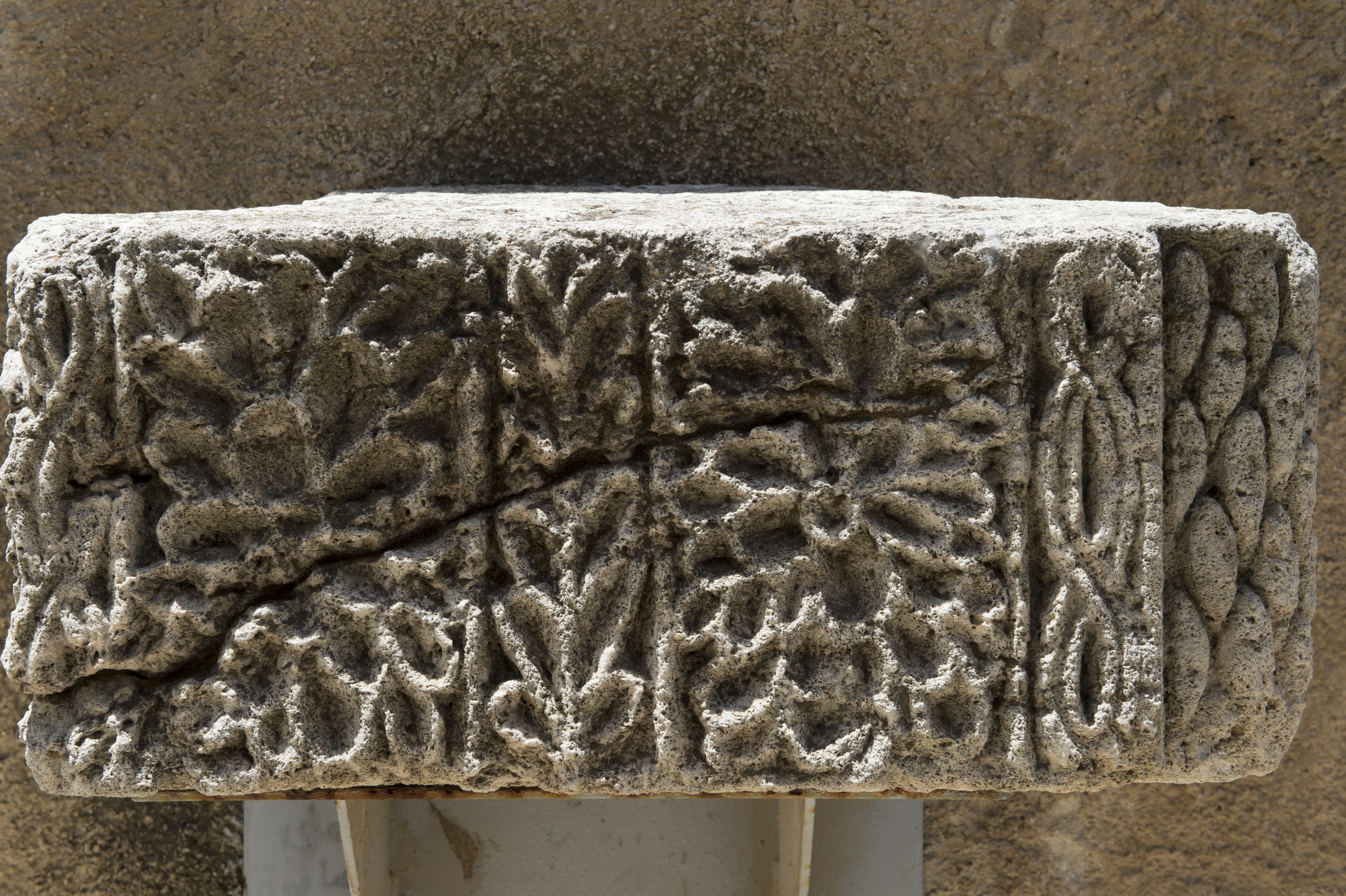
Decorated stone

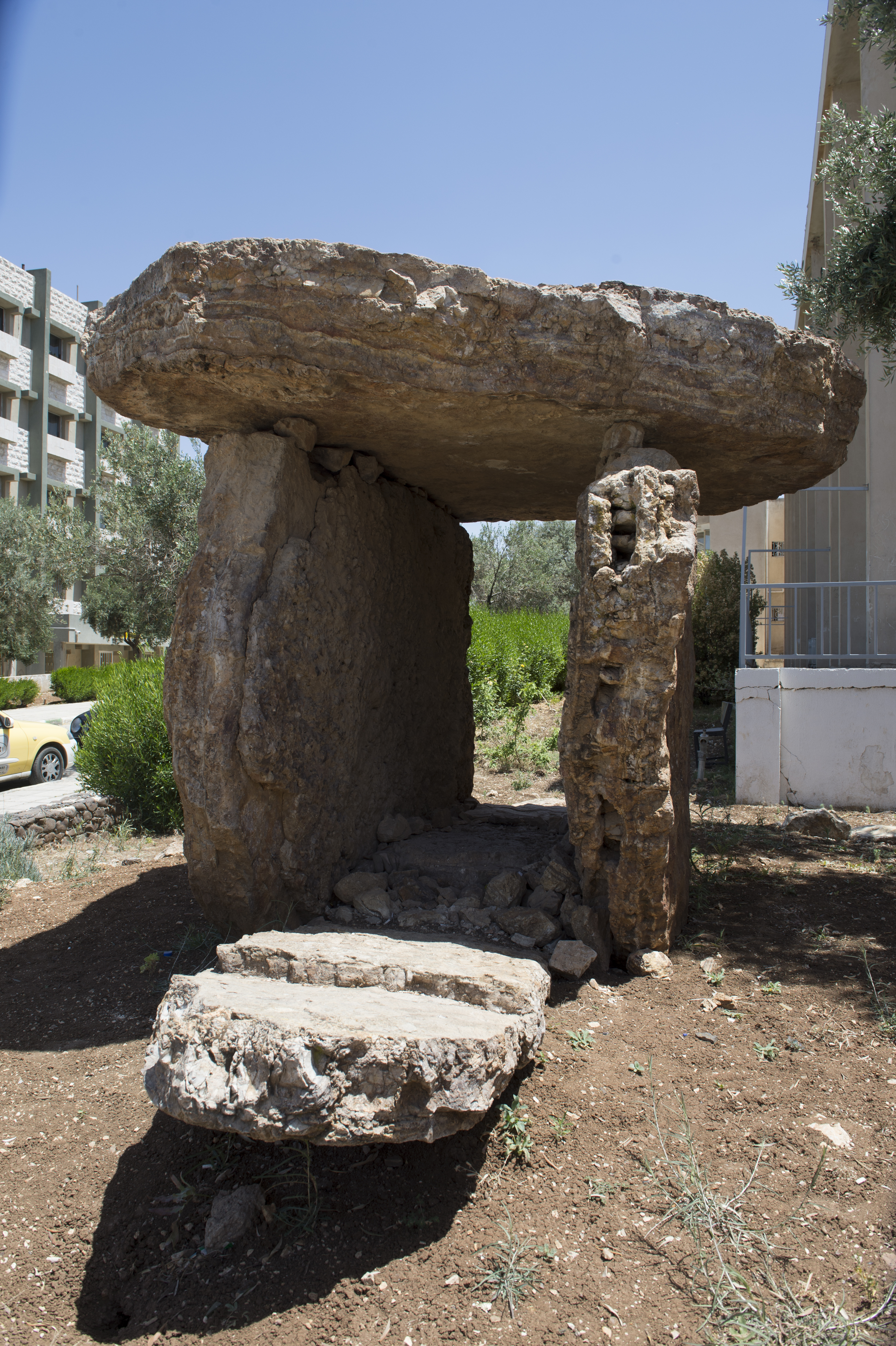
A dolmen in from Kufr Youba from the 5th to 2nd millennium BC

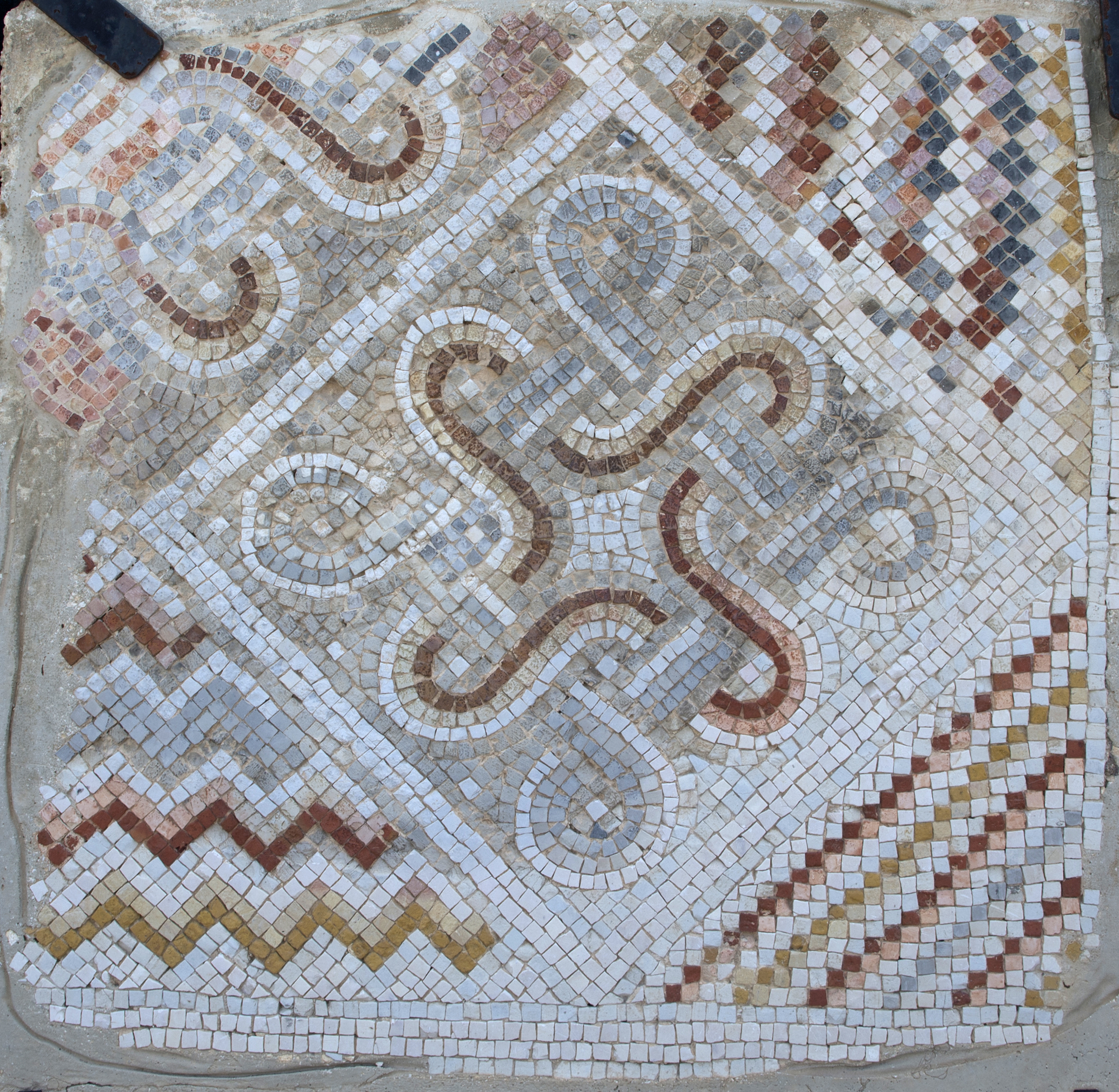
Mosaic design in the Jordanian Museum of Heritage
