= Irbid National University =

Coordinates: 32°24′23″N 35°57′01″E

Irbid National University (INU)
- جامِعَةُ إِرْبِد الأَهْلية
- Irbid National University
- Type: Private
- Established: 1994
- Affiliations: IAU, FUIW, UNIMED, AArU
- Students: 6,000
- Location: Irbid, Jordan
- Campus: Urban 1 square kilometre (250 acres)
- Colors: Orange and white ^{[a]}
- Nickname: INU
- Website: Irbid National University

Irbid National University (Arabic: جامعة إربد الأهلية, abbreviated INU) is a university in Jordan. Established in 1994, it is located in the northern town of Irbid. It has a student body of 6,000. Irbid National University is a private university, certified by the Ministry of Higher Education and Scientific Research of Jordan, the Islamic Association of Arab Universities (AARU), (FUW), and the Federation and European universities (UNIMED). The university President is Prof. Mohammed Said Subbarini.

== Scientific Research Deanship ==
The deanship performs scientific research through the Scientific Research Committee, whose task is to supervise and support scientific research and its publishing. The deanship is also responsible for publishing Irbid Journal for Research and Studies (a-referred journal) in the field of humanities. The deanship also holds lectures, seminars and conferences.

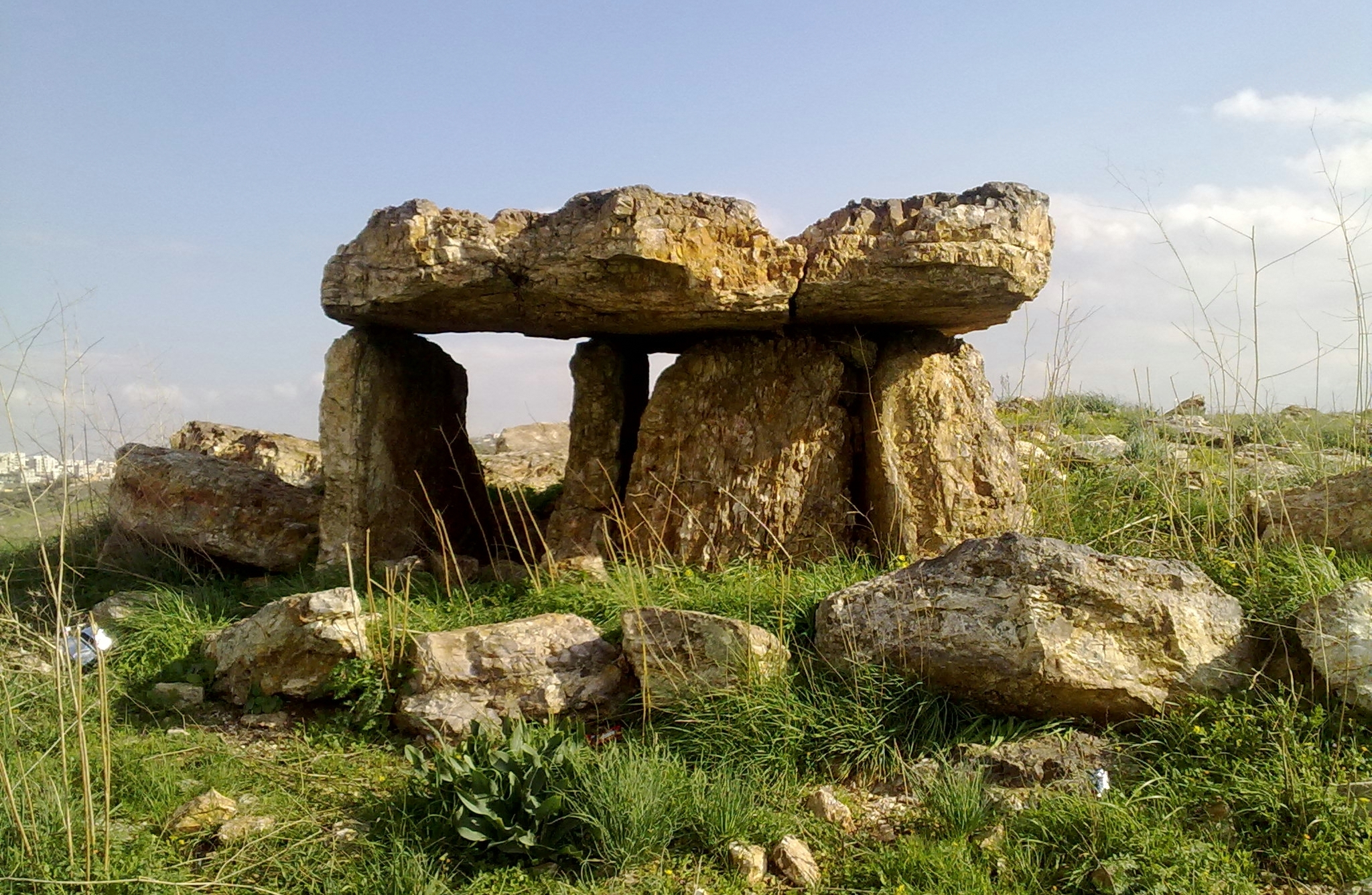

== The Academics Appropriations ==
- Memorandum of Academic understanding with the University of the Near East in Turkey
- Memorandum of Academic understanding with the Fayoum University in Egypt.
- Memorandum of Academic understanding with the Oman College of Management and Technology in Oman.

== Students Deanship ==
=== Department of Student Activities ===
The section is a part of the Deanship of Student Affairs.

=== University Drawing Hall ===
The university has established a studio on the campus to provide a space for artistic talent and its development.

=== Music ===
Activities include:

- singing,
- acting on stage,
- folk arts and folk songs,
- Dabka (a folk collective dance),
- developing the students' artistic sense,
- forming teams of choral singers, individual singers, music players, theater actors, and folklore performers,
- training students to play musical instruments.

=== Sports activities ===
Students participate in sport activities organized by the Sports Federation of Jordanian Universities.

== Faculties ==
=== Faculty of Sharia Law ===
- Department of Law
- Master of law

=== Faculty of Business Administration and Finance ===
- Accounting
- Finance and banking
- Business management
- Tourism management and hospitality
- Marketing
- Management information system
- Accounting information system

=== Faculty of Arts and the Arts ===
- Arabic Language and Literature
- English Language and Literature
- Translation
- Graphic design

=== Faculty of Science and Technology Information ===
- Computer science
- Computer information systems
- Mathematics
- Master of Mathematics

=== Faculty of Nursing ===
- Department of Nursing

=== Faculty of Educational Sciences ===
- Classroom teacher
- Special education
- Psychological counseling and educational

=== Faculty of Engineering ===
- Civil Engineering and Constructions

== Facilities ==
- Arab Club for Arab Students was established in order to care for Arab students who study at the university. The club organizes tours for them to identify archaeological and tourist sites of Jordan and inform them of the attractions and other activities.

== INU Centers ==
Center of Development, Accreditation and Quality Assurance

- Preparing studies that concern the development of the university,
- Considering the national accreditation standards, and working on improving the administrative performance of the university,
- Preparing plans and programs aiming at developing the quality of the academic performance at the university,
- Following up the requirement for accreditation of the faculties and academic departments.
- Center of Communication, Consultation and Continuing Education The center was established in 2001. Its role is to provide expertise, scientific, and technical support to the public and private institutions.
- Computer Center is a technical office in the university .
- Health Care Center located inside the campus, provides health services for the students.

== See also ==
- List of Islamic educational institutions
