= Private Hospitals Association (Jordan) =

- Established: 1984
- Type: Non-profit organization
- Headquarters: Jbeiha, Amman, Jordan
- Region served: Health care
- Services: Health services
- Members: 48
- Key people: Dr.Fawzi Al-Hammouri
- Website: www.phajordan.org

The Private Hospitals Association (PHA) is a private, voluntary, non-profit organization that was established in 1984, representing the private hospitals in Jordan. Its membership is open to all private hospitals in Jordan. PHA applies quality standards and general guidelines on its members in order to maintain and perhaps raise the Jordanian health care reputation. Recently, the association applied the national accreditation program to all medical sectors that belong to the association. And now, Jordan’s high tech hospitals, such as the Specialty Hospital, the Arab Medical Centre, Al Khalidi Medical Center and many others, with their high class healthcare at costs significantly less than those of Europe and the US, gained the PHA a high reputation for its work and progress for reaching its aim.

== Aim ==
PHA main aim is for the hospitals that are members of its association become globally competitive with the medical service that they offer. With that aim in mind, PHA attempt to make the Jordanian hospitals to become amongst the medical service leaders on a global level.

== History ==
The Private Hospitals Association was founded in 1984, the idea of the association was founded when the private hospitals in Jordan needed to have a united front and sort their demands when approaching the government. The association did not have an immediate impact, since it started weak and with only 8 members. Recently, the PHA became an admirable association with 48 members, and their achievements were widely recognized and proved influential on the public, mainly, under the guidance of their chairman Dr. Fawzi Al-Hammouri.

=== USAID-funded SABEQ Program ===
USAID-funded Sustainable Achievement of Business Expansion and Quality program (SABEQ) is a five year broad economic development initiative implemented by BearingPoint Inc. and a team of international and Jordanian partner firms. By both supporting improvements in the business environment and offering assistance to increase productivity in Jordanian medical services' businesses, it supports the primary objective of building up the private medical sector as a high profile powerful engine of economic growth.

USAID/SABEQ program signed Memoranda of Understanding with the PHA in October 2007. Ever since the program started, the PHA have received support in various forms, most of the support was directed towards technical assistance. The association started participating in international medical travel conferences more extensively, and that is to pursue the goals of the program.

The goal of the funding is to enhance the quality of services provided, increase their market access internationally, increase the number of incoming patients, help develop medical professionals, and train PHA members and staff to the standards compliant with international certifications, such as JCI's standards.

== List of Members ==
=== Board members ===
- The Specialty Hospital
- Al-Israa Hospital
- Marka Islamic Hospital
- Arab Medical Center
- Palestine Hospital
- Al-Hamaideh Hospital
- Qaser Shabeeb Hospital

=== Other Members ===
- King Hussein Cancer Center
- Jordan Hospital (Jordan)
- Islamic Hospital
- Al Khalidi Medical Center
- Ibn Al-Haytham Hospital
- Eye Hospital
- Amman Surgical Hospital
- Istiklal Hospital
- Shemesani Hospital
- Luzmilla Hospital
- Al-Amal Hospital
- Hiba Hospital
- Al-Hayat Hospital
- The Specialty Center for Fertility & Genetics
- Jerusalem Hospital
- Philadelphia Hospital
- Al-Rasheed Hospital
- Al-Istishari Hospital
- Al-Ahli Hospital
- Al-Hanan General Hospital
- Akilah Hospital
- Al-Bayader Hospital
- Italian Hospital, Amman
- Abdulhadi Eye Hospital
- Jabal Amman Hospital
- International Hospital
- Al-Aqsa Hospital
- Italian Hospital, Karak
- Al-Hikma Modern Hospital
- Al-Razi New Hospital
- Jabal Al-Zaitoon Hospital
- Najjah Hospital
- Irbid Specialty Hospital
- Qawasemi Hospital
- ibn Al-Nafis Hospital
- Irbid Islamic Hospital
- Society Rosary Sisters Hospital
- Al-Safa`a Specialty Hospital
- Islamic Hospital
- Aqaba Modern Hospital
- Al-Mahabba Hospital
