= Abdul Hamid Sharaf School =

Location
- Shuhada'a Amman Street; Amman 11181; Jordan

Information
- Type: Private international school
- Motto: A School for Children, an Education for Life
- Established: 1980; 46 years ago
- School district: West Amman
- Principal: Sue Dahdah
- Grades: K-12
- Enrollment: 600
- Education system: Scholastic Aptitude Subject Tests (SAT) and SAT II; International General Certificate of Secondary Education
- Colors: Gold and navy
- Accreditations: COGNIA; Jordanian Ministry of Education; British Council
- Affiliations: Near East South Asia Council of Overseas Schools
- Website: ahss.edu.jo

Abdul Hamid Sharaf School (or AHSS) is a private international, coeducational, non-parochial, K-12 day school serving the needs of a diverse group of students, international and local in Amman, Jordan. Founded in 1980 by Farid and Sue Dahdah, the school is named after the former prime minister Abdul Hamid Sharaf who had recently died at the time.

The school offers the American system and the British system. The main language of instruction is English while Arabic is supplemented for other subjects.

== Overview ==
Jordanian Senator Leila A. Sharaf presented the school with a sizable fund to establish its first library.

Dr. Sue Dahdah and husband, engineer Farid Dahdah, founded the school in 1980. It was among the first of many modern, private, non-parochial schools to open in Amman, Jordan in the early eighties. Starting with 18 students in a small rented villa, the school soon outgrew the location and moved to its current premises in the summer of 1991. The school currently has capacity for 800 students in kindergarten through twelfth grades.

The school is located in the affluent neighbourhood of Deir Ghbar in West Amman, not far from the American Embassy, the British Embassy and The French School. The easiest ways to reach the school are to exit from the airport highway or to come from the sixth circle.

AHSS was reaccredited in spring 2019 by Cognia formerly known as North Central Association Commission on Accreditation and School Improvement (NCA CASI) a division of AdvancED. Among the advantages of accreditation, graduates of the American high school program at AHSS can obtain equalization for their school diploma from the Jordanian Ministry of Education. Equalization is necessary for students who plan to do their college or university studies in Jordan. AHSS is an associate member of the Near East South Asia Council of Overseas Schools (NESA). Dr. Sue Dahdah has been a member since 1971 while AHSS has been since 1980. School representatives attend the annual administrators' and teachers' conferences organized by NESA throughout the Near Eastern and South Asian regions.

Uniform is worn by grades one through seven, comprising navy blue pants or culottes, white shirts and turquoise or navy blue cardigans and pullovers. Neckties and scarves are worn for formal occasions. For physical education, white school T-shirt, shorts and training suit are worn. Uniform is not required for students in grades eight through twelve although a dress code is in effect.

== Curriculum ==
The school teaches two curricula:

- An American curriculum is taught which prepares students to write the Scholastic Aptitude Test (SAT) and the Scholastic Aptitude Subject Tests (SAT II). This curriculum is aimed at the students who are from the United States and plan to return there for their post-secondary education. Although completion of the SAT stream and passing marks in the SAT and SAT II tests is recognized by Jordanian universities as proof of secondary education it is not looked favorably upon.
- The International General Certificate of Secondary Education (IGCSE) curriculum is also taught. This prepares students for the O-levels and A-levels exams which are internationally recognized as proof of secondary education. Passing marks in the O and A level exams are recognized as completion of secondary education by most Jordanian Universities. This stream is often chosen by students who plan to continue into post-secondary education outside of Jordan or in a Jordanian university which teaches in English.

== See also ==
- List of schools in Jordan
