= Islamic School, Irbid =

- Irbid; Jordan

Information
- Type: Private
- Religious affiliation: Islam
- Established: 1980
- Enrollment: 500+
- Average class size: 50 sq.m. – 75 sq.m
- Student to teacher ratio: 25:1
- Colors: Green and white
- Website: Islamic Center

Islamic School, Irbid (Arabic: المدرسة الاسلامية اربد) is a private islamic school, situated in Irbid, Jordan. It was opened in 1980, and has been steadily growing ever since. The school is split into two sections, boys and girls sections, boys under 5th grade are in the girls section. The school's teaching level reaches up to 10th grade. The school teaches the Jordanian system, Tawjihi.

== History ==
Islamic School, Irbid was established in Irbid in 1980 by the Muslim Brothers.

== See also ==
- Education in Jordan
