= Modern American School (Jordan) =

- Arabic: المدرسة الامريكية الحديثة

Location
- Amman; Jordan; 31.9524°N 35.8593°E

Information
- Type: American private international school
- Motto: Your passport to the world
- Established: 1986; 40 years ago
- Founder: Tayseir Zamel
- Grades: K-12
- Enrollment: 1,000
- Education system: American Common Core Standard; International Baccalaureate Diploma Programme
- Mascot: Eagles
- Accreditations: North Central Association of Colleges and Schools; AdvancED; Southern Association of Colleges and Schools; Northwest Accreditation Commission
- Affiliations: Council of International Schools; Jordanian Ministry of Education; Near East South Asia; AmidEast; British Council
- Website: www.mas.edu.jo

The Modern American School (Arabic: المدرسة الامريكية الحديثة) is an American private international, co-educational school based in Amman, Jordan. Founded in 1986, the school provides primary, middle, and secondary education for students from 3 to 18 years. The school is made up of students from over 52 different nationalities including Jordanians, other Arabs, and Non-Arab nationalities; approximately 30% of the staff being non-Jordanian from over 27 different countries.

Graduates of the school have gone on to attend Harvard University, Yale University, University of Pennsylvania, Massachusetts Institute of Technology, University of Glasgow, London School of Economics, University of Toronto, and the Heidelberg University as well as other pursuits.

== History ==
The Modern American School (previously Modern Education School (مدارس التربية الحديثة)) was established in 1986 as a private co-ed day school for grades Kindergarten through 6th, later expanding to include grades 7th through 12th. It began offering international studies in 1996 and was licensed to teach IGCSE and Edexcel GCE Programs in 1997. The school became licensed to teach the American Diploma Program in 2003 and became an AP examination center in 2008, allowing the College Board to administer the college SAT admissions test. It uses the American Common Core Standard for its curriculum and course progression.

The Modern American School is an IB World School and offers the International Baccalaureate Diploma Programme.

== Facilities and curriculum ==
The curriculum of the Modern American School includes teaching students about technology and providing them with instruction on the use of iPads, laptop computers, and eBooks. It also has a community outreach program where students have engaged in a number of local activities such as fundraising and community service. It is also a Model United Nations school that teaches curriculum on research, public speaking, debating, and writing skills as well as diplomacy, international relations and the United Nations, with students attending international conferences in New York United Nations, Harvard University MUN, and Yale MUN.

The Modern American School is based in Amman and accommodates approximately 1,000 students. It occupies two buildings near the Ukrainian embassy and includes an auditorium, two gymnasiums, football fields, computer centers, cafeterias, music room, outdoor playgrounds and arts and crafts room.

== See also ==
- Education in Jordan
- History of Jordan
- List of schools in Jordan
