= Jadara University =

University in Irbid, Jordan

- جامعة جدارا
- Type: Private
- Established: 2005
- Affiliations: IAU, FUIW, AArU
- Chairman: Shukri Marashdeh
- President: Mohammed Obaidat
- Students: 15000
- Location: Irbid, Jordan
- Campus: Urban 1 square kilometre (250 acres)
- Colors: Cornflower Blue and LemonChiffon Yellow ^{[a]}
- Nickname: JAU
- Website: www.jadara.edu.jo

Jadara University (Arabic: جامعة جدارا) is a university located in the northern province of Irbid Governorate in Jordan, on the international highway to the north of the city of Irbid, the governorate's capital.

== History ==
Jadara University was approved by the Ministry of Higher Education and Scientific Research in November 2004, and was established in the following year. It awards undergraduate and master's degrees mainly in Arabic, and English literature, science, and information technology. The university was named after the historic city of Gadara which is located about 20 km from the university campus.

== Academics ==
There are eight colleges in the university:

- Faculty of Engineering: offers degrees in computer, communications, and civil engineering.
- Faculty of Pharmacy
- Faculty of Education
- Faculty of Law
- Faculty of Business and Administration Sciences
- Faculty of Science and Information Technology
- Faculty of Languages and Humanitarian Sciences
- Faculty of Graduate Studies

== See also ==
- List of Islamic educational institutions
