= Al Khalidi Medical Center =

Coordinates: 31°57′1″N 35°54′13″E

Al Khalidi Medical Center مركز الخالدي الطبي

Geography
- Location: Amman, Jordan

Organisation
- Type: Specialist

History
- Founded: 1978

Links
- Website: http://khmc.jo/english/
- Other links: Health in Jordan

Al Khalidi Medical Center (KMC) is one of the leading heart and comprehensive specialty hospitals in Jordan. KMC is the sole private-sector medical institution to be selected by the Royal Commission on Health towards studying and setting the National Agenda, called for by King Abdullah II, to lay the ground for the healthcare industry in Jordan for the next 20 years.

== History ==
Al Khalidi Medical Center was originally established in 1978 by Dr. Ibrahim Al Khalidi as a maternity hospital.

== Facilities and departments ==
- Cardiac Unit
- Diagnostic and Interventional Radiology
- Diagnostic and Therapeutic Oncology
- Fertility, Genetics and Reproductive Surgery
- Gastroenterology Unit
- General Surgery and Specialized Laparoscopy
- Histopathology and Cytopathology
- Intensive Stroke Unit
- Kidney Dialysis Unit
- Eye Center
- Laboratory
- Lithotripsy Unit
- Nutritional and Dietary Consultation
- Orthopedic and Spine Surgery
